= Sarobarpur =

- Village
- Interactive map of Sarobarpur
- Country: India
- State: Orissa
- District: Cuttack

Languages
  - Official: Oriya
- Time zone: UTC+5:30 (IST)
- Vehicle registration: OR-
- Website: odisha.gov.in

Sarobarpur is a village in the district of Cuttack in Odisha, India. It is on the bank of the river Chitrotpala.
