= Birupa River =

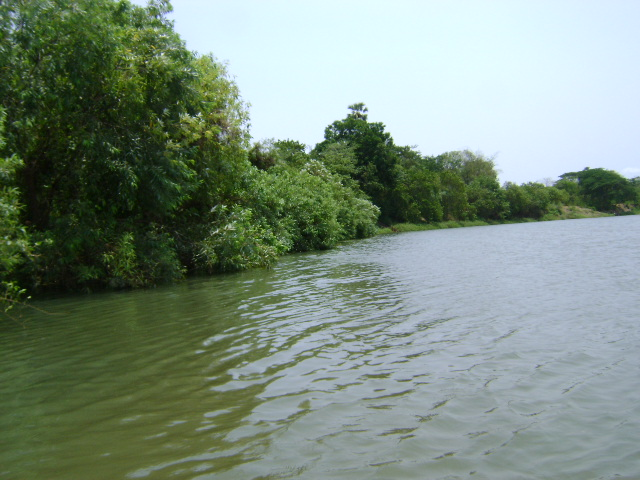
- Birupa River near village Mulabasant, Cuttack

- Location of Birupa River mouth Birupa River (India)

Location
- Country: India
- State: Chhattisgarh, Odisha

Physical characteristics
- Source: Mahanadi River
  - coordinates: 20°29′49.9″N 85°54′15.24″E
- Mouth: Bay of Bengal
  - location: Dhamra

The Birupa River is a river which flows through the Indian state of Odisha. It is a distributary of the Mahanadi River. It originates from the Mahanadi's upper reaches and joins the Brahmani River at Krushnanagar before emptying into the Bay of Bengal at Dhamra. It is one of several distributaries of the Mahanadi, including the Paika, Chitroptala, Genguti, and Lun rivers.

Birupa River holds historical and religious significance in coastal Orissa. The river was a popular destination for pilgrims visiting Buddhist shrines, and it also served as a route for Buddhist monks traveling to Ceylon and Java. The Pancha Pandava temple in Jalauka, built around the 9th century, has beautiful carvings from the Somavamsi dynasty and is situated on the banks of the River Birupa.

Badi Genguti is a river tributary of the Birupa River in the coastal plains of the Lower Sub Basin of Mahanadi. It branches out from the Birupa at Samsarpur village and flows for 25 kilometer before rejoining the Birupa at Kharagpur village. Both the Birupa and Badi Genguti rivers traverse through the districts of Cuttack, Kendrapara, and Jagatsinghpur, characterized by elevations ranging from 10 to 50 meters.

== Water quality and pollution ==
According to The Odisha State Pollution Control Board's 2023 monitoring data, the river had an annual average pH of 7.8, dissolved oxygen concentration of 7.5 mg/L and biochemical oxygen demand (BOD) of 1.5 mg/L. The water was classified as Class C. The total and faecal coliform concentrations each exceeded their respective designated criteria in one of the 12 observations recorded during the year.
