= 1960 North Indian Ocean cyclone season =

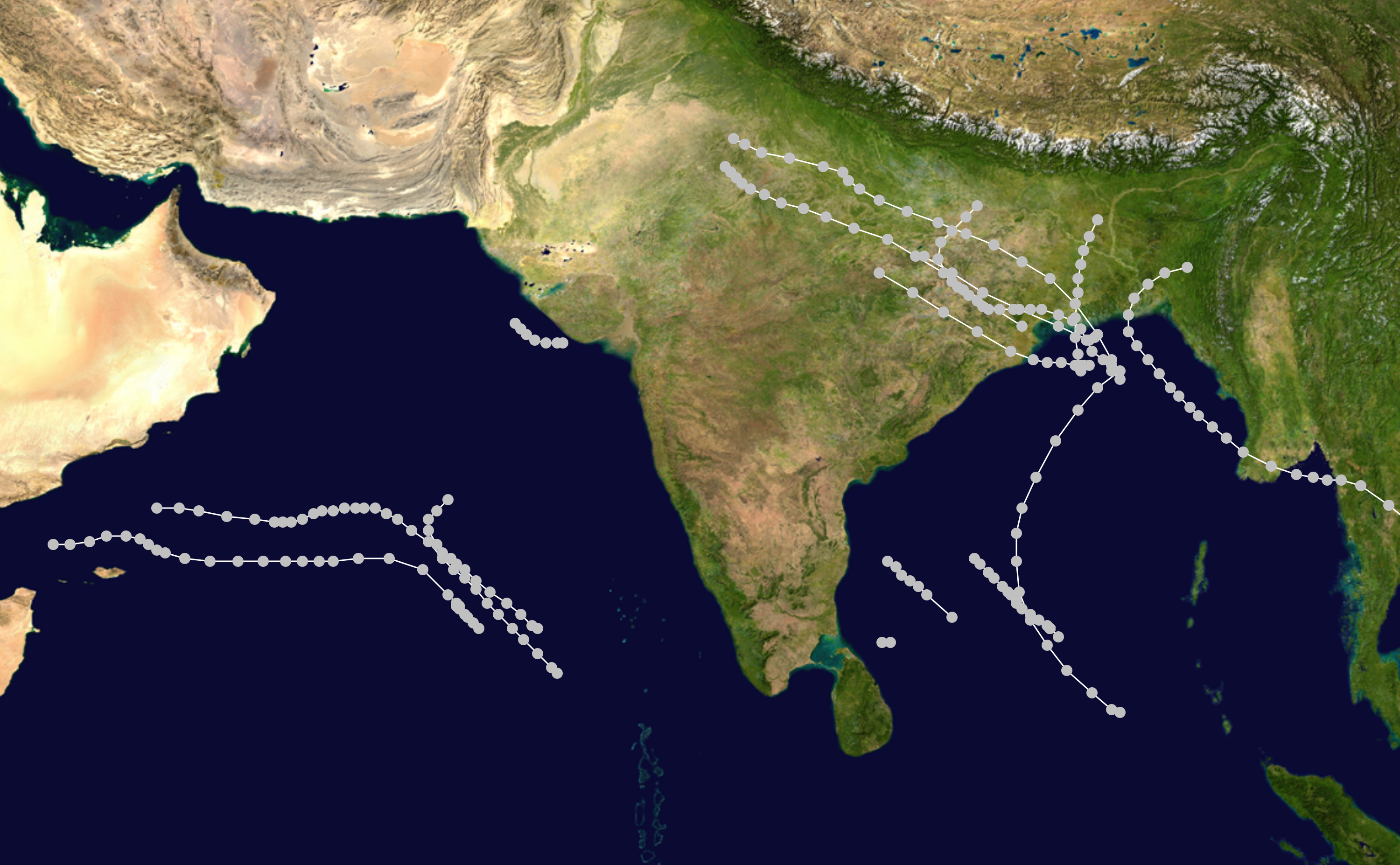
- Season summary map

Seasonal boundaries
- First system formed: May 10, 1960
- Last system dissipated: December 3, 1960

Strongest storm
- Name: Ten
  - Maximum winds: 150 km/h (90 mph) (3-minute sustained)
  - Lowest pressure: 967 hPa (mbar)

Seasonal statistics
- Depressions: 15
- Deep depressions: 8
- Cyclonic storms: 5
- Very severe cyclonic storms: 2
- Total fatalities: 20,341 total
- Total damage: At least $9.24 million (1960 USD)

Related articles
- 1960 Atlantic hurricane season; 1960 Pacific hurricane season; 1960 Pacific typhoon season

The 1960 North Indian Ocean cyclone season featured two deadly tropical cyclones that collectively killed approximately 20,000 people collectively in East Pakistan (present-day Bangladesh). The Indian subcontinent divides the North Indian Ocean into two areas: the Bay of Bengal to the east and the Arabian Sea to the west. The official Regional Specialized Meteorological Centre for this basin is the India Meteorological Department (IMD), while the Joint Typhoon Warning Center releases unofficial advisories. On average, five storms form in the North Indian Ocean every season with dual peaks in activity during May and November. Cyclones that occurred between 45°E and 100°E were included in seasonal records by the IMD.

Fifteen depressions developed during the 1960 season, with five becoming cyclonic storms. The majority of the activity took place in the Bay of Bengal, where eleven systems formed; however, the season's first storm formed over the Arabian Sea on May 10. The storm produced hurricane-force winds and attained a barometric air pressure of 974 mbar (hPa; 28.76 inHg). The deadliest and most intense cyclone of the season was Severe Cyclonic Storm Ten, which killed 14,174 in East Pakistan in early November. With peak winds estimated at 150 km/h (95 mph) and a pressure of 966.7 mbar (hPa; 28.55 inHg), it struck just three weeks after the previous system devastated the same area. The storm produced a 6.1 m (20 ft) storm tide that swept 16 km (10 mi) inland, submerging several small islands. The two storms left a combined 200,000–300,000 people homeless. These systems marked the start of an unusually active period of cyclones impacting East Pakistan, culminating ten years later with the 1970 Bhola cyclone, which killed between 300,000 and 500,000 people. During the 1960 season, several depressions impacted India with heavy rainfall. Collectively, these systems killed 167 people.

== Systems ==
=== Very Severe Cyclonic Storm One ===
- Very severe cyclonic storm (IMD)
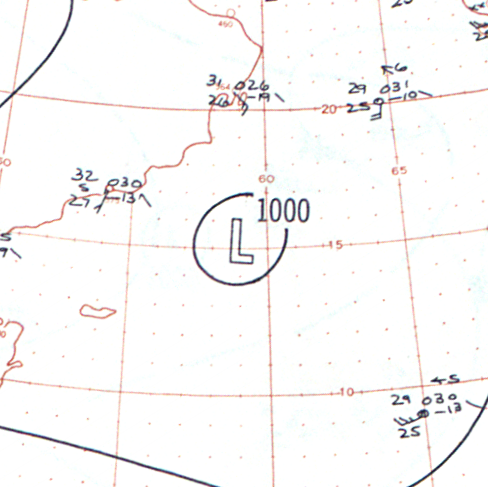
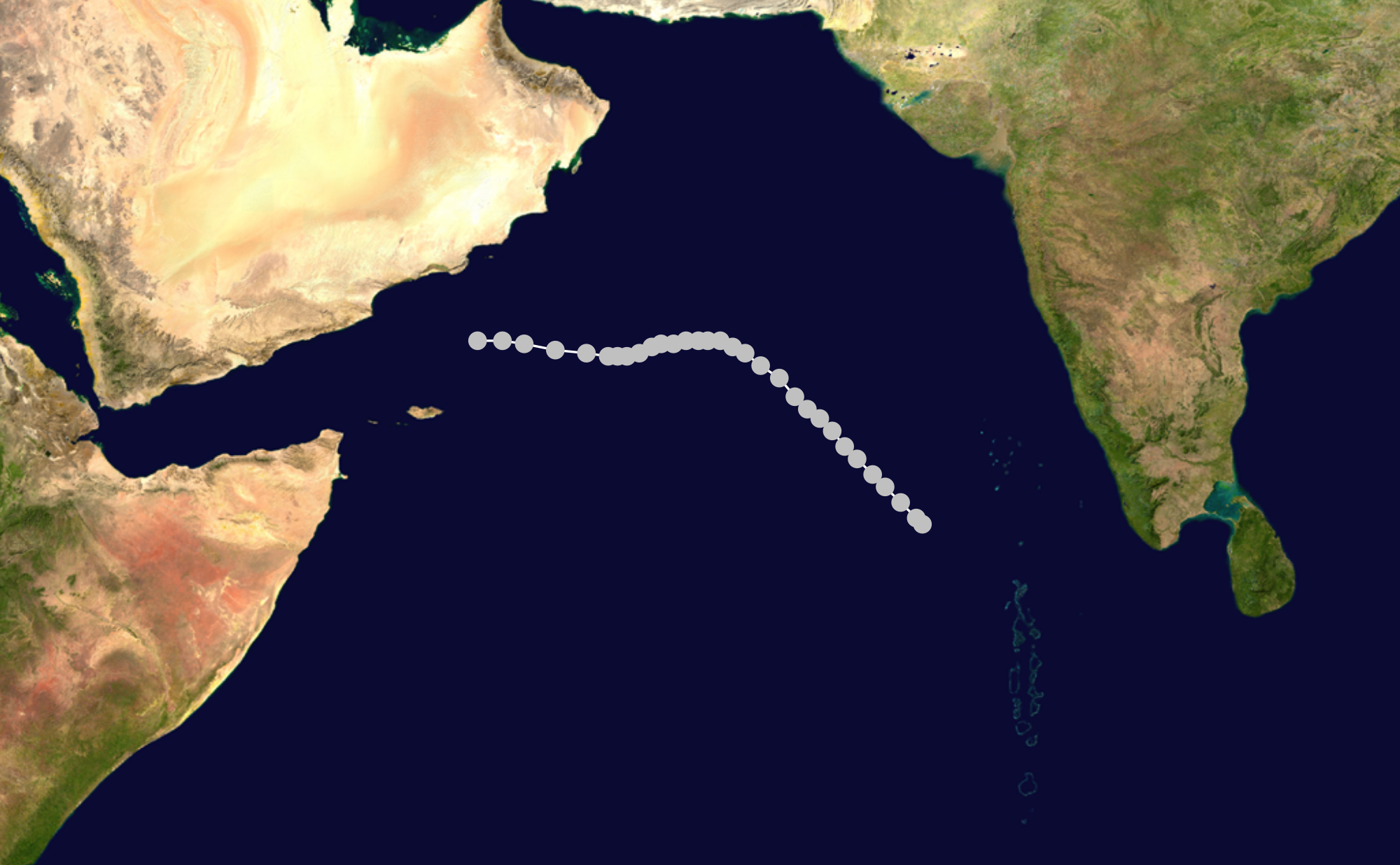
- Duration: May 10 – May 19
- Peak intensity: 120 km/h (75 mph) (3-min); 974 hPa (mbar)

On May 10, an area of low pressure was identified over the Arabian Sea roughly 400 km (250 mi) to the northwest of the Maldives. Moving northwestward, it gradually became more concentrated, becoming a depression by the evening of May 12. After turning more toward the west, the system continued to slowly deepen. On May 14, the S.S. Kampala sailed into the system, encountering 55 km/h (35 mph) winds and rough seas. Over the following two days, the depression intensified into a cyclonic storm, with gale-force winds extending 150 km (90 mi) from the center. During the overnight hours of May 16 through 17, the SS Mohammedi sailed almost directly into the center of the cyclone, reporting a barometric pressure of 974 mbar (hPa; 28.76 inHg) and 9.1 m (30 ft) waves. Several other vessels, such as the S.S. Saudi and S.S. Exchequer, encountered the storm. Both ships reported hurricane-force winds, and the latter endured seas as high as 15.2 m (50 ft) early on May 18. Later that day, the storm weakened so rapidly the crew of the S.S. Exchequer were able to watch the pressure on their barometer actively rise. The storm continued westward, moving ashore Al Mahrah Governorate in eastern South Yemen as a severe cyclonic storm on May 18, before dissipating. The next Yemeni landfall would not occur again until 2015 with Cyclone Chapala.

As a developing cyclone, the system brought monsoon-like moisture to much of the Maldives, Ceylon (present-day Sri Lanka), and southern India between May 14 and 17. The heaviest rains fell on May 17, with 190 mm (7.5 in) recorded at Cochin, India, that day.

=== Deep Depression Two ===
- Deep depression (IMD)
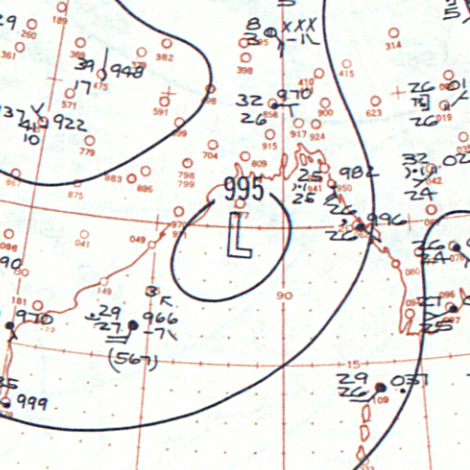
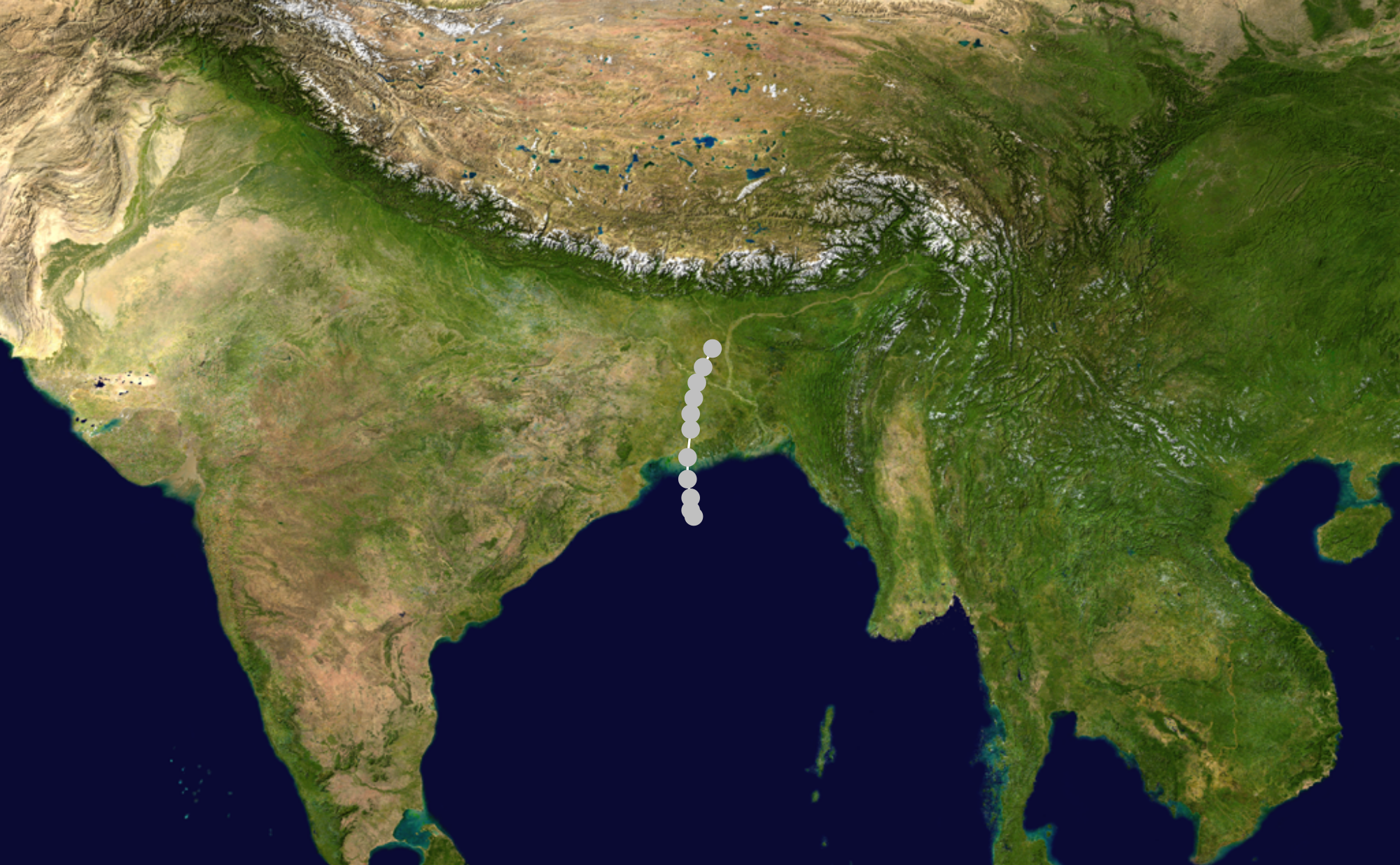
- Duration: May 26 – May 29
- Peak intensity: 75 km/h (45 mph) (3-min); 988 hPa (mbar)

On May 25, an upper-level low-pressure system developed over the northern Bay of Bengal. The following day, a surface low formed in association with this feature. By May 27, the low further consolidated into a depression while situated 285 km (175 mi) south of Calcutta, India. Tracking northward, it intensified into a deep depression before making landfall on the Sundarbans region of West Bengal—near the border of East Pakistan—early on May 28. Though it was classified a deep depression, stronger winds of up to 75 km/h (45 mph) were reported from Sagar Island. Based on measurements from nearby stations, it is estimated that the system attained a minimum pressure of 988 mb (hPa; 29.18 inHg) just as it moved ashore. Once inland, the system quickly weakened and accelerated northeastward. It later dissipated over Assam on May 30.

The system produced torrential rains across eastern India and East Pakistan. In Cherrapunji, 540 mm (21 in) of rain fell during a two-day span, while many other areas recorded over 100 mm (3.9 in). No rainfall data were available from West Bengal and Assam. Strong winds from the storm destroyed numerous homes in West Bengal, and at least seven people were killed.

=== Deep Depression Three ===
- Deep depression (IMD)
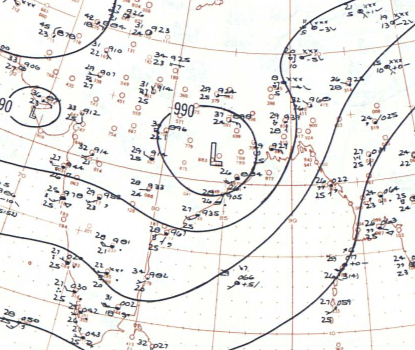
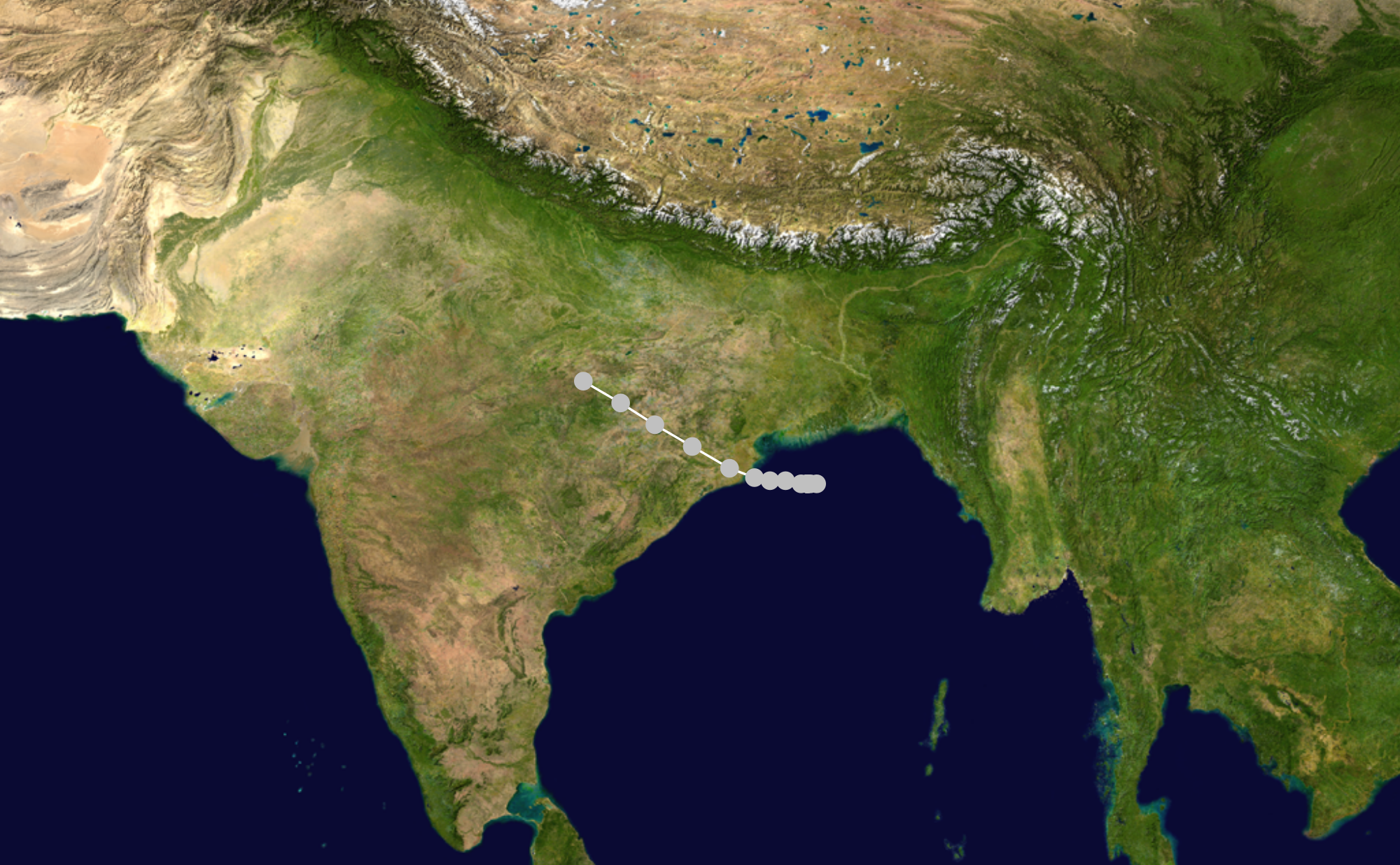
- Duration: June 29 – July 4
- Peak intensity: Winds not specified;

On June 29, a trough, associated with an upper-level low, extended over the northwestern Bay of Bengal. Following a drop in sea-level pressure over the next day, a depression formed in this area. Moving slowly westward, the storm intensified into a deep depression early on July 2. Shortly thereafter, the system made landfall near Angul, India, and accelerated toward the northwest. The system later dissipated on July 4 over Madhya Pradesh after being absorbed back into the trough that it developed from.

Widespread heavy rains accompanied the depression along portions of the coast from Orissa to West Bengal and as far inland as Madhya. Sagar Island recorded at least 360 mm (14 in) of rain over the span of two days, while Vishakhapatnam received 300 mm (12 in) in just one. As much as 100 mm (3.9 in) of precipitation fell across Madhya Pradesh.

=== Depression Four ===
- Depression (IMD)
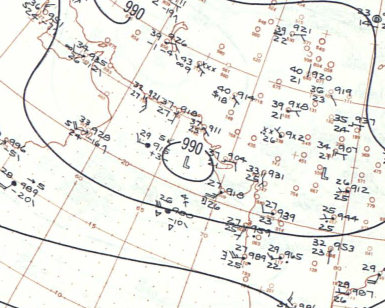
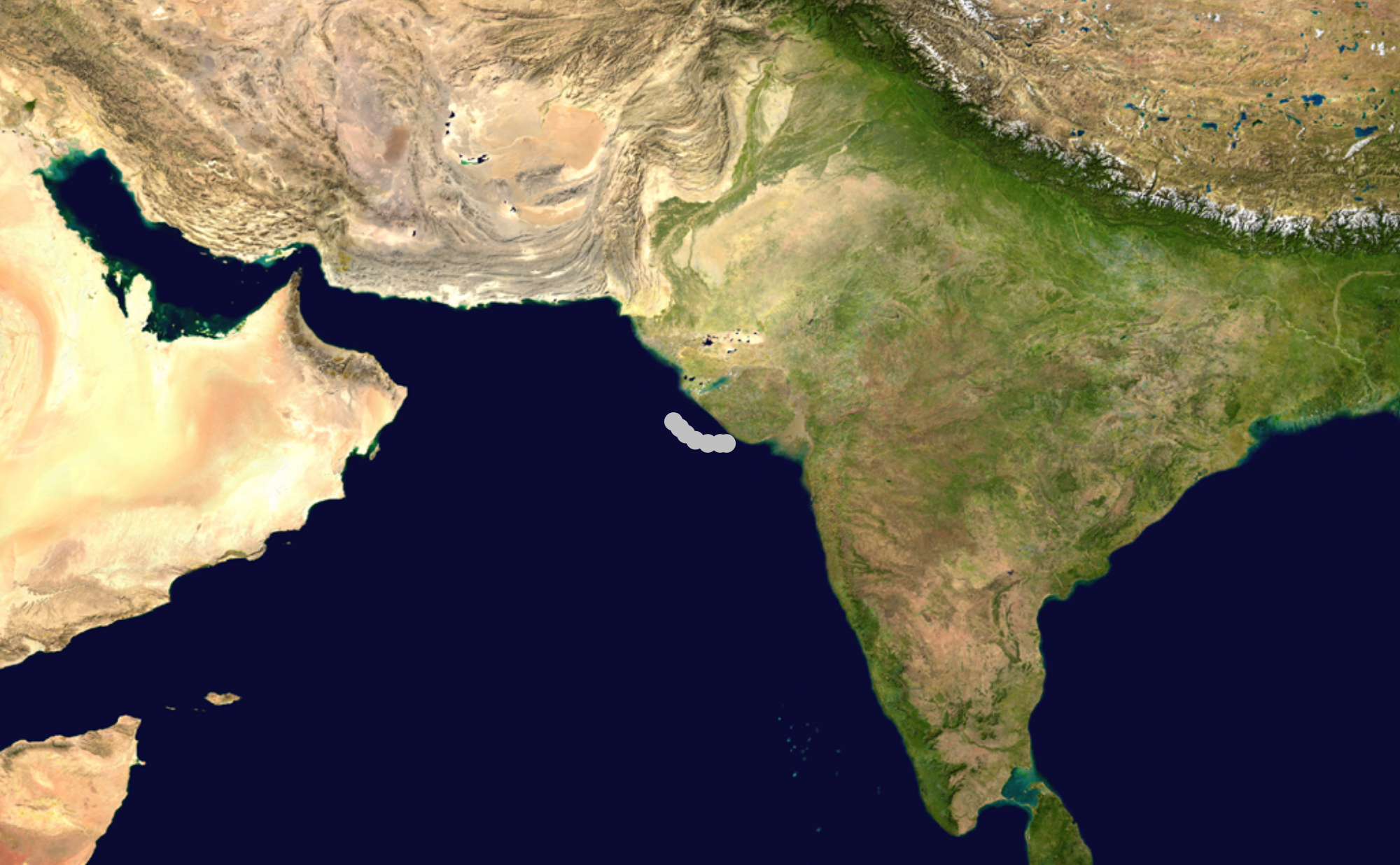
- Duration: July 2 – July 5
- Peak intensity: 75 km/h (45 mph) (3-min); 991 hPa (mbar)

On June 26, a slow-moving trough developed over Gujarat. By July 2, the system developed into a shallow land depression while situated 80 km (50 mi) north of Veraval. Winds in the area were measured up to 45 km/h (30 mph); however, as the system moved offshore, winds quickly increased to 65 km/h (40 mph). Low pressures were recorded across the area, with a minimum of 990.8 mbar (hPa; 29.26 inHg) measured in Dwarka. Becoming nearly stationary off the coast of Gujarat, the depression began to interact with an approaching monsoon. This interaction caused winds to increase, with two vessels reporting 75 km/h (45 mph) winds during the late morning hours of July 4. Later that day, the system began moving to the northwest and quickly weakened. It was last noted the following day as a dissipating low over the northeastern Arabian Sea.

Between July 2 and 4, heavy rains amounting to more than 300 mm (12 in) fell across much of the Saurashtra region of Gujarat. These rains triggered severe flooding that killed at least 35 people and left 6,000 others homeless. At least 500 homes were destroyed in the region.

=== Depression Five ===
- Depression (IMD)
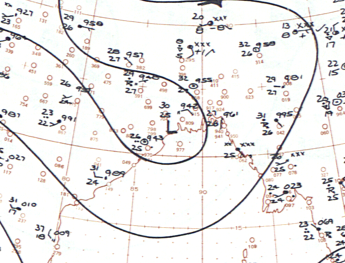
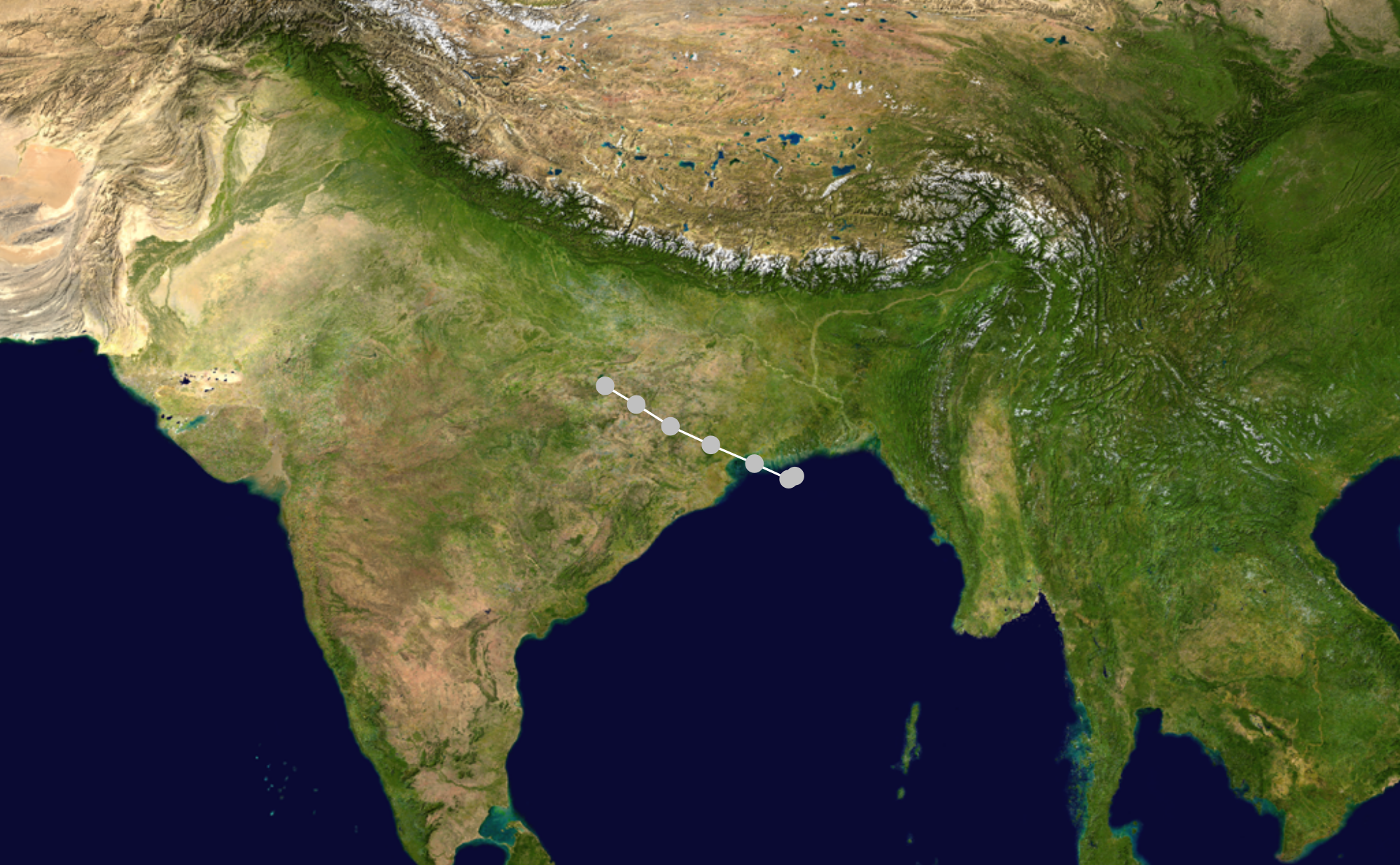
- Duration: August 8 – August 10
- Peak intensity: 30 km/h (15 mph) (3-min); 996 hPa (mbar)

On August 6, a westward moving area of low pressure was identified over Burma. Initially an upper-level system, it gradually propagated to the surface, becoming a depression on August 9. Tracking west-northwestward, the system crossed the Indian coastline later that day near Balasore, where a pressure of 996.1 mbar (hPa; 29.41 inHg) was measured. Sustained winds reached just 30 km/h (20 mph). Once onshore, the depression degenerated into a remnant low on August 10. The remnants continued northwestward, ultimately merging with a trough over Uttar Pradesh on August 12.

The depression dropped heavy rains over parts of India between August 8 and August 14. The highest totals were recorded on August 14 when 240 mm (9.4 in) of rain fell in Jhansi. Significant flooding took place along the Ganges River as a result of the rains. Forty villages along the river near Fatehgarh were inundated.

=== Deep Depression Six ===
- Deep depression (IMD)
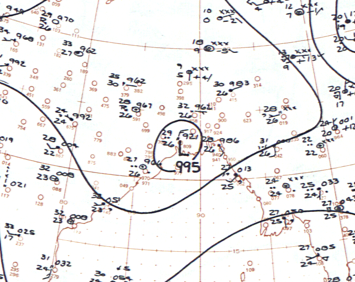
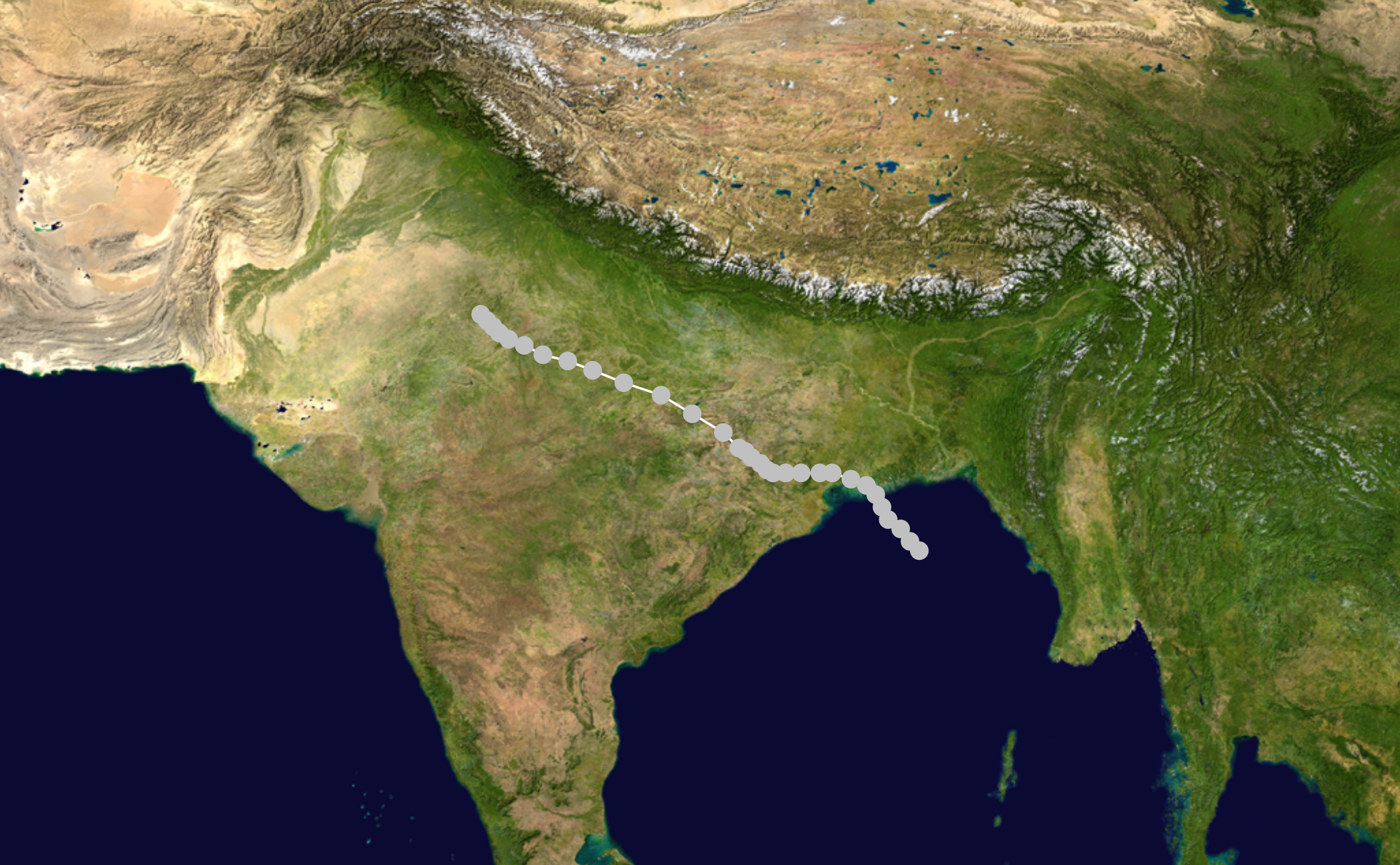
- Duration: August 12 – August 20
- Peak intensity: 45 km/h (30 mph) (3-min);

As the previous depression dissipated over India, a new circulation developed over the Bay of Bengal on August 12. This system quickly became a depression. Moving slowly northwestward, it became a deep depression on August 14 before making landfall in the Sundarbans region. Winds up to 45 km/h (30 mph) were reported in Sandheads. Once onshore, it turned westward and slowed while maintaining its intensity. The system finally weakened on August 18 as it resumed moving northwestward again, and two days later it dissipated over southeastern Rajasthan.

Large portions of India were affected by rains from the depression, with Orissa and Madhya receiving the heaviest rains. According to Prime Minister Jawaharlal Nehru, up to 1,000 mm (40 in) of rain fell across portions of Orissa. The tremendous precipitation triggered disastrous floods that killed at least 65 people. Continued rains over the next two weeks exacerbated the situation and by August 30, an estimated 2.5 million people were homeless. Most affected were areas around the Mahanadi River and its tributaries where flood waters reached 3.7 m (12 ft) in depth. At least 85 villages were reportedly destroyed. Orissa government officials described the disaster as "the worst in living memory." Rail lines and roads were severely damaged across the state, hampering initial relief efforts. A total of 1.87 million acres of crops were flooded and overall damage amounted to ₹112 million.

=== Depression Seven ===
- Depression (IMD)
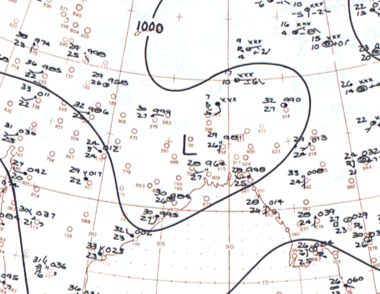
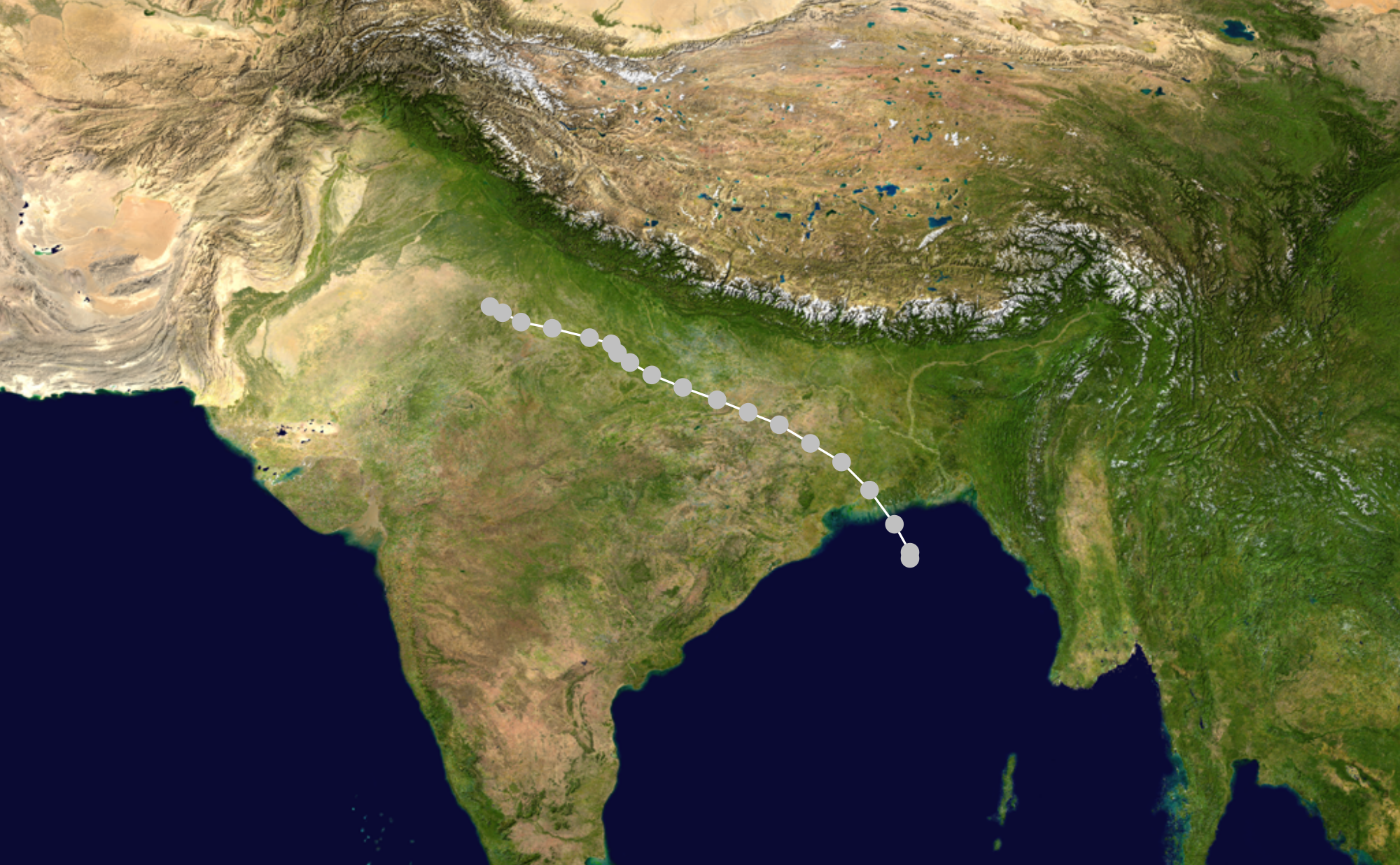
- Duration: August 24 – August 28
- Peak intensity: Winds not specified;

On August 20, a wave of low pressure formed over Burma. Moving westwards, this upper-level system triggered the development of a surface low two days later over the Bay of Bengal. Turning northwestward, the low consolidated into a depression by August 24 before making landfall in the Sundarbans region later that day. Once onshore, the depression degenerated into a remnant low; the remnants persisted until August 28 when they were absorbed into a trough over Rajasthan Pradesh.

Heavy rains affected much of Bihar, Madhya Pradesh, Punjab, and Uttar Pradesh. The highest daily precipitation total was measured in Ghatsila at 190 mm (7.5 in). These rains triggered severe flooding along the Beas, Ganges, Jamuna, and Sutlej rivers. Large areas of Uttar Pradesh were left submerged, and significant crop and property damage took place in Punjab. At least 55 people were killed in Punjab alone, and losses overall amounted to $9.24 million (1960 USD).

=== Deep Depression Eight ===
- Deep depression (IMD)
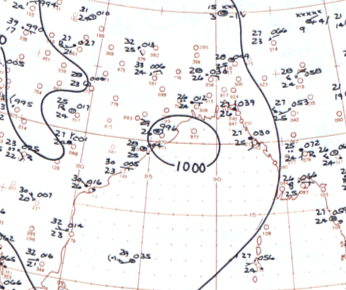
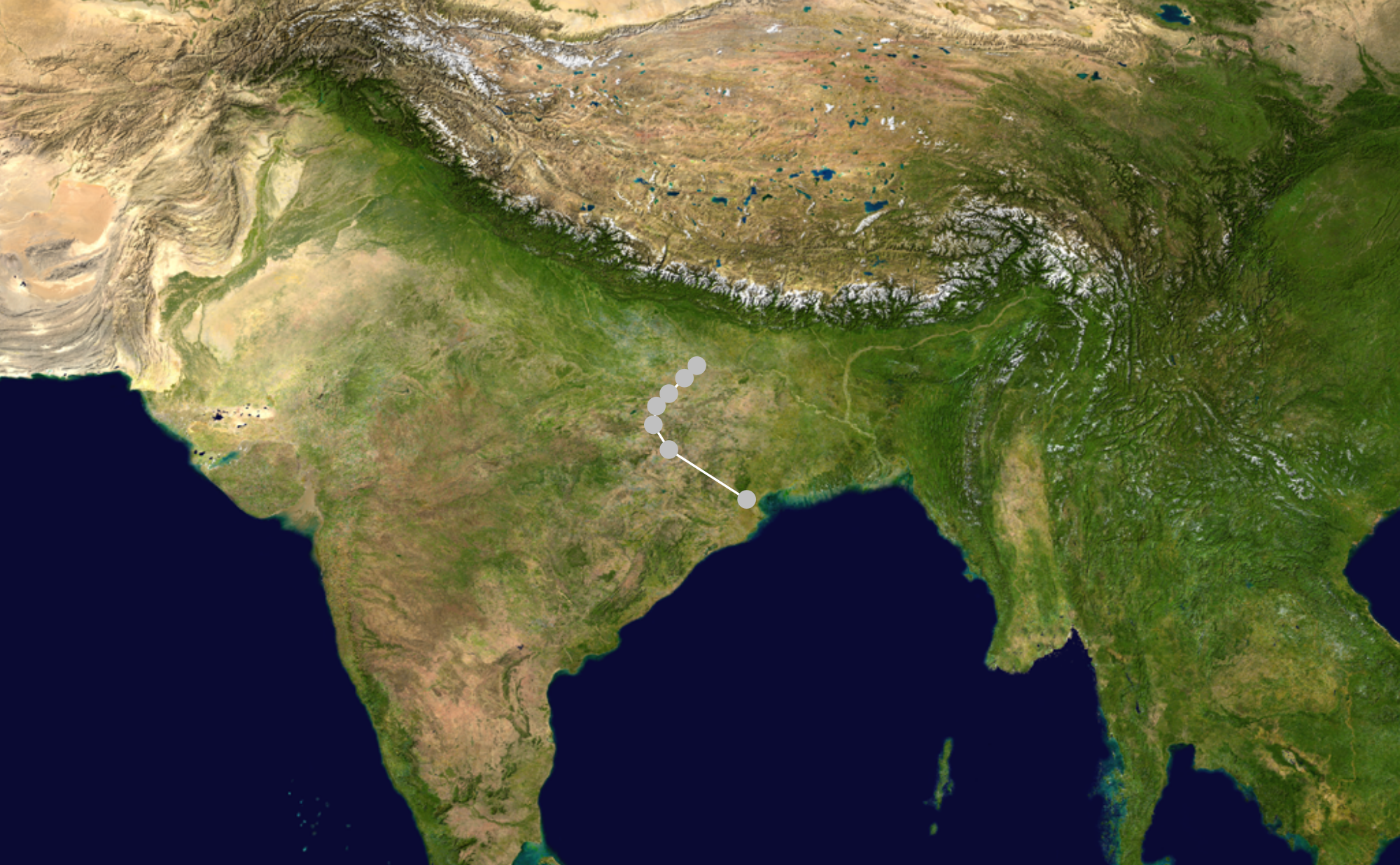
- Duration: September 24 – September 28
- Peak intensity: 55 km/h (35 mph) (3-min);

On September 22, an area of low pressure was identified over the Andaman Sea. Tracking northwestward, the system consolidated into a depression two days later over the Bay of Bengal. During the evening of September 24, it further strengthened to a deep depression, with winds of 55 km/h (35 mph). Early the next day it made landfall in Orissa between Balasore and Chandabali. Once onshore, the system slowed and turned northeastward. It later dissipated over Nepal on September 28 as it interacted with the Himalayas.

Heavy rains accompanying the depression affected much of Bihar, Orissa, and West Bengal. Many areas recorded more than 200 mm (7.9 in) during a four-day span; the highest single-day total was 270 mm (11 in) in Bahadurganj.

=== Severe Cyclonic Storm Nine ===
- Severe cyclonic storm (IMD)
- Category 2 tropical cyclone (SSHWS)
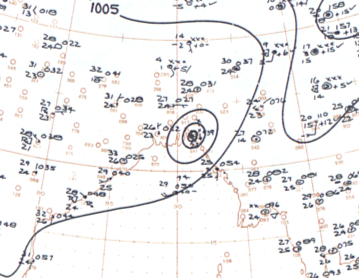
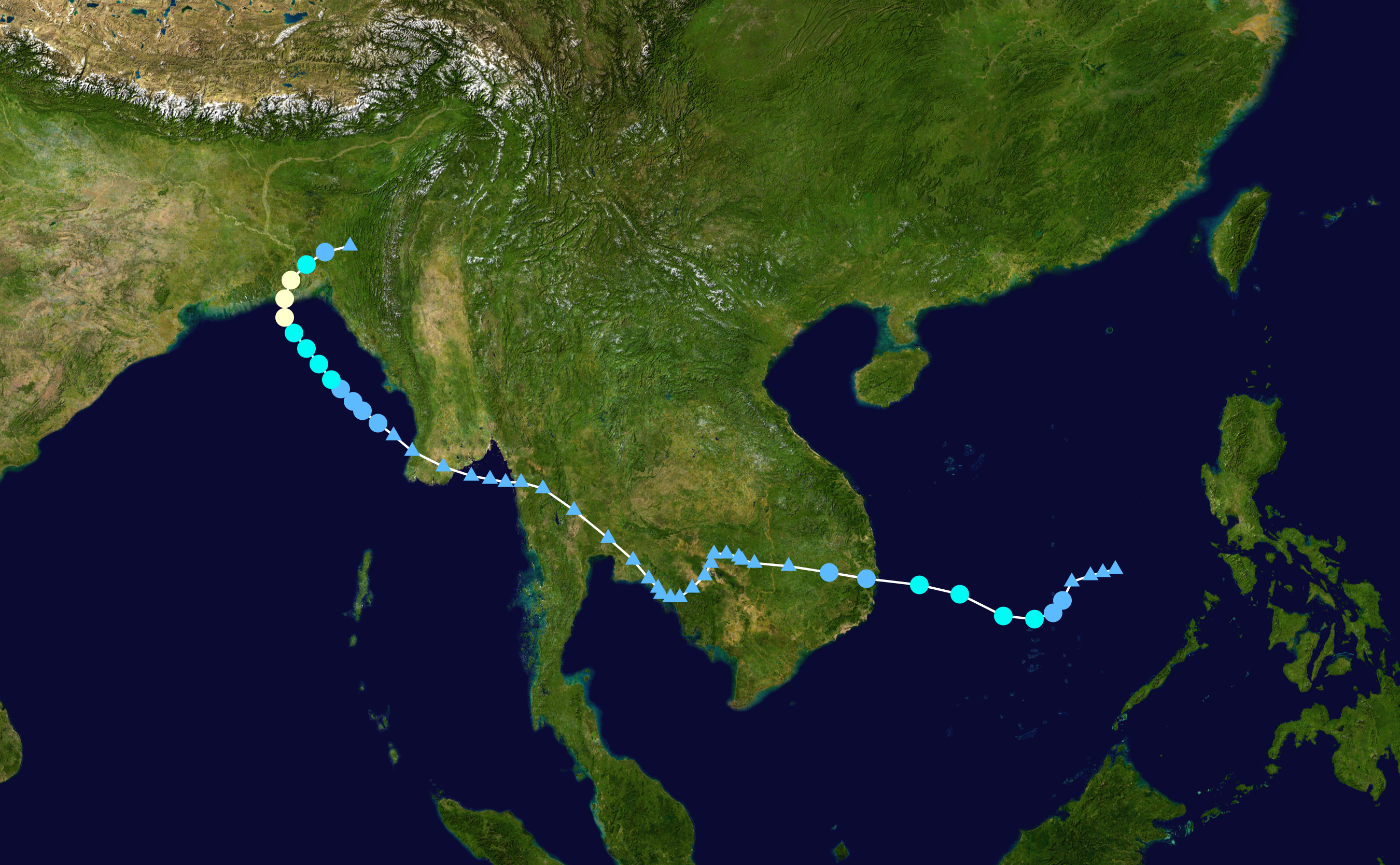
- Duration: October 5 (Entered basin) – October 12
- Peak intensity: 110 km/h (70 mph) (3-min); 986 hPa (mbar)

In late September, a tropical storm developed over the South China Sea. Striking South Vietnam, the storm slowly moved over Indochina, ultimately crossing 100°E and entering the basin on October 5 while over Thailand. After crossing southern Burma, the low moved northwestward over the Bay of Bengal and reorganized. Following a report of 45 km/h (30 mph) winds from the S.S. Glenpark on October 8, the system was classified as a depression. Moving slowly northwestwards, the system further deepened into a cyclonic storm on October 9. Several ships in the path of the storm recorded gale-force winds, depicting its strengthening. Early on October 10, it became a severe cyclonic storm and soon reached its peak intensity with winds of 110 km/h (70 mph). Its central pressure at this time was estimated to be 986 mbar (hPa; 29.12 inHg). The National Oceanic and Atmospheric Administration (NOAA) estimated that the storm attained one-minute sustained winds of 155 km/h (95 mph). Turning northeastward, the system made landfall between Barisal and Noakhali in East Pakistan, with the eye passing directly over the islands of Bhola, Hatia, and Ramgati. Once onshore, the system quickly weakened and ultimately dissipated over Assam early on October 12.

Across coastal areas of East Pakistan, the storm wrought catastrophic damage. A 5.8 m (19 ft) tidal surge washed over the islands of Hatia, Sandwip, Kutubdia. Communications across the region were crippled, and it took six days for word of the scale of damage to reach officials. Entire villages were reportedly wiped out by the storm. Approximately 35,000 homes were destroyed, most of which were thatched huts made of bamboo and mud. About 300 schools were also damaged. The worst damage took place on Ramgati Island where 3,500 people were killed. Roughly 95 percent of the island's structure were destroyed, forcing residents to cling to trees for survival. Only two police officers survived and were able to inform government officials of the disaster. An estimated 6,000 people perished while another 100,000 were left homeless. Heavy rain accompanied the storm, with Cox's Bazar reporting 180 mm (7.1 in). Relief efforts in the wake of the storm were hampered by the nation's poor infrastructure and debris left behind. On October 18, members of the East Pakistani military were deployed to the hardest hit areas to provide stable communication and clean drinking water.

=== Very Severe Cyclonic Storm Ten ===
- Very severe cyclonic storm (IMD)
- Category 3 tropical cyclone (SSHWS)
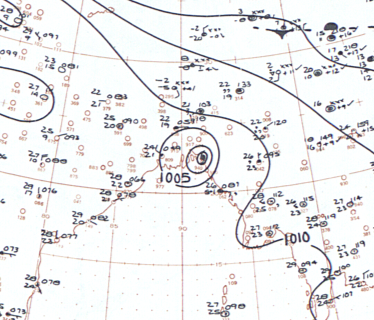
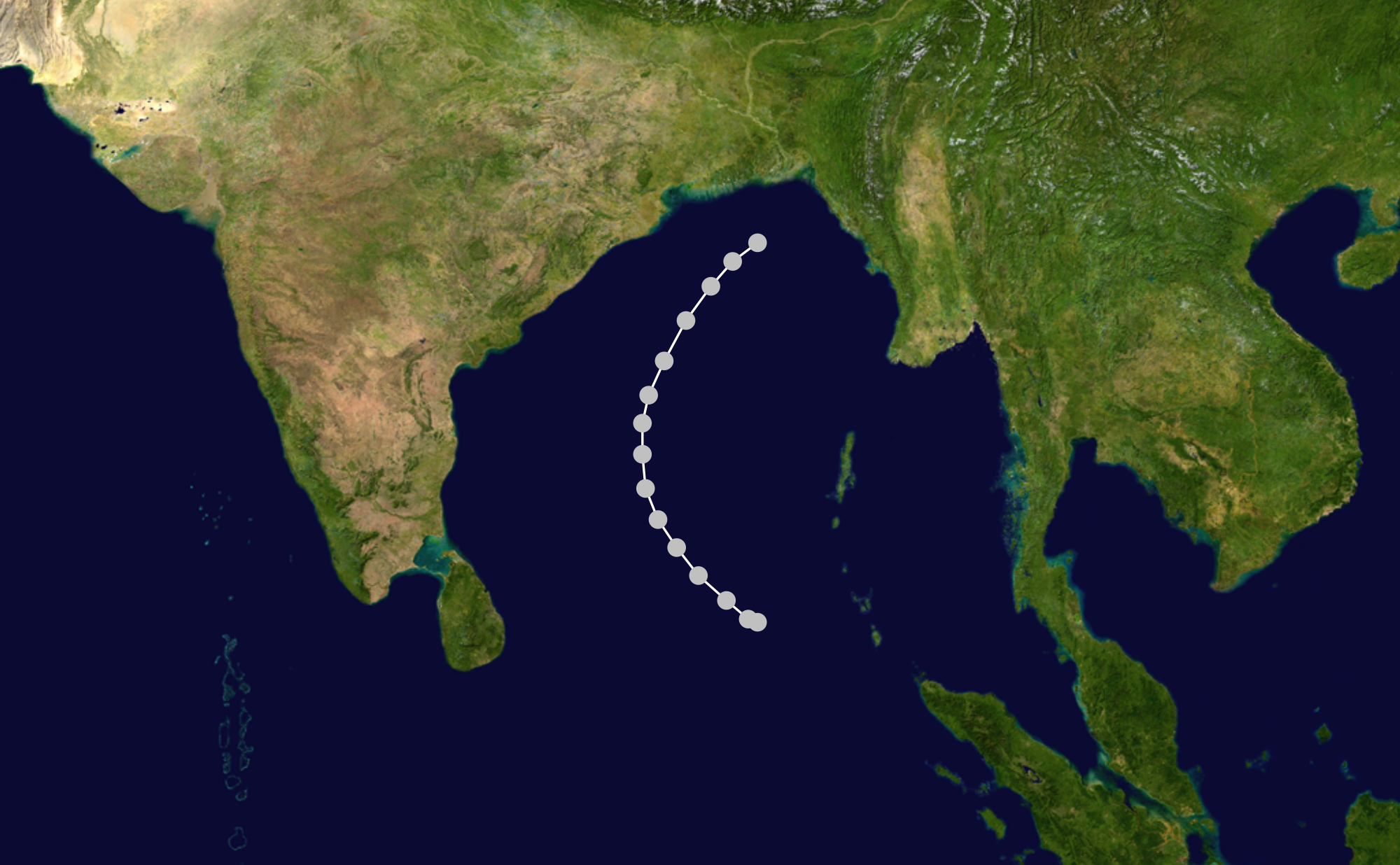
- Duration: October 27 – November 1
- Peak intensity: 150 km/h (90 mph) (3-min); 967 hPa (mbar)

On October 26, a trough formed over the south Andaman Sea and extended into the southern Bay of Bengal. By October 28, the system consolidated into a depression as it moved northwestward. Steadily intensifying, several ships encountered the storms increasing winds as it moved northward in the Bay. On October 30, it attained gale-force winds and further became a severe cyclonic storm early the next morning. During the evening of October 31, the IST Barisal recorded winds of 130 km/h (80 mph), indicating that the system had acquired a core of hurricane-force winds. The maximum winds of this system is unknown, though reports indicated that winds peaked between 150 and 215 km/h (90 and 135 mph). NOAA estimated that the storm peaked with one-minute sustained winds of 195 km/h (120 mph) and a pressure of 966.7 mbar (hPa; 28.55 inHg). The storm soon made landfall with great intensity near Noakhali, East Pakistan, just three weeks after the previous storm devastated the country. Once onshore, cold, dry air quickly wrapped around the backside of the cyclone. Within four hours of landfall, little rainfall was reported near the storm's eye. The cyclone rapidly weakened and dissipated the following day over the Lushai Hills.

Striking East Pakistan as a powerful storm, the system produced a storm tide of 6.1 m (20 ft) that moved 16 km (10 mi) inland, devastating many communities. A storm surge of 6.7 m (22 ft) was measured in Halishahar. In addition to the surge, there was a series of tidal waves that followed the storm, causing additional damage. Offshore, these waves were estimated at 12.2 m (40 ft); though they significantly decreased before impacting land. Chittagong and surrounding communities were regarded as the hardest hit, with most being submerged in 3 m (10 ft) of water. The city's port was largely destroyed, with almost every vessel washed ashore. Some were found 16 km (10 mi) away and one even at another port. The storm's intense winds, estimated as high as 240 km/h (150 mph) on Sandwip Island, leveled buildings and scattered debris over large distances. Crops were flattened by the storm and in some instances had been "burnt" by the sheer force of the wind. A total of 14,174 people perished in the storm while another 200,000 were left homeless. Following the mass casualties from the two storms, the Government of Pakistan requested the assistance of former National Hurricane Center director, Gordon E. Dunn, to improve the warning system.

=== Depression Eleven ===
- Depression (IMD)
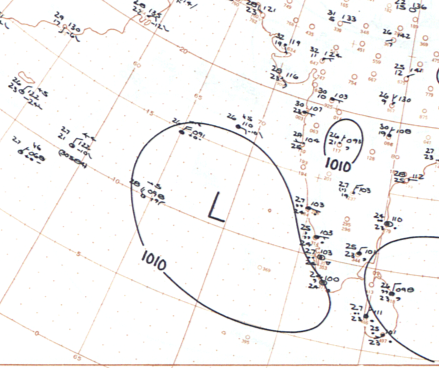
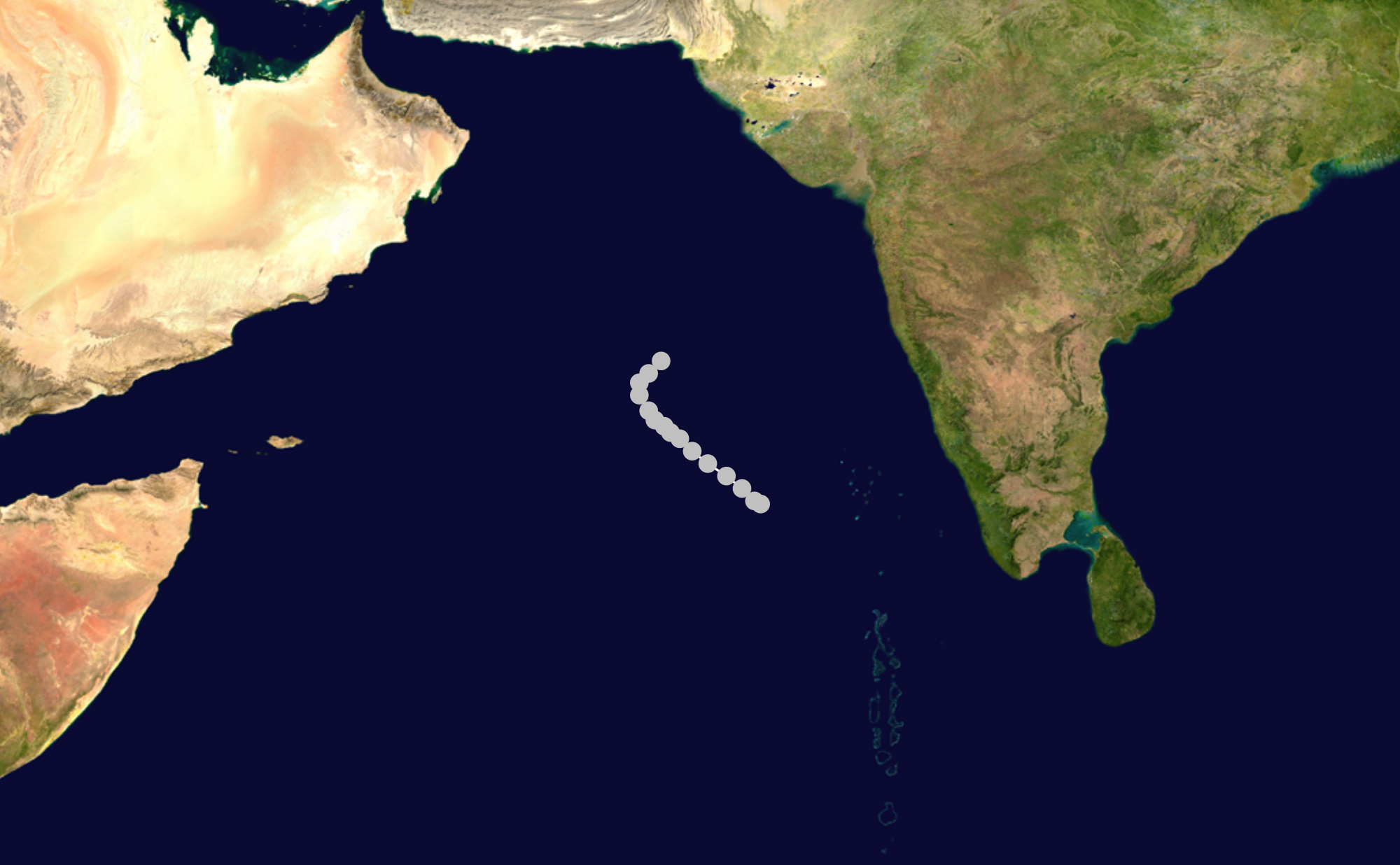
- Duration: November 7 – November 10
- Peak intensity: 45 km/h (30 mph) (3-min);

On November 5, an area of low pressure was identified over Lakshadweep. Tracking generally northwestward, it gradually organized into a depression by November 7. No further development took place over the following days and the system eventually degraded into a remnant low on November 10. Though the storm itself did not impact land, associated moisture combined with a low over the Bay of Bengal to produce heavy rains across Madras State and nearby islands from November 5 to 10.

=== Shallow Depression Twelve ===
- Depression (IMD)
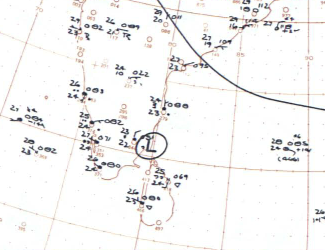
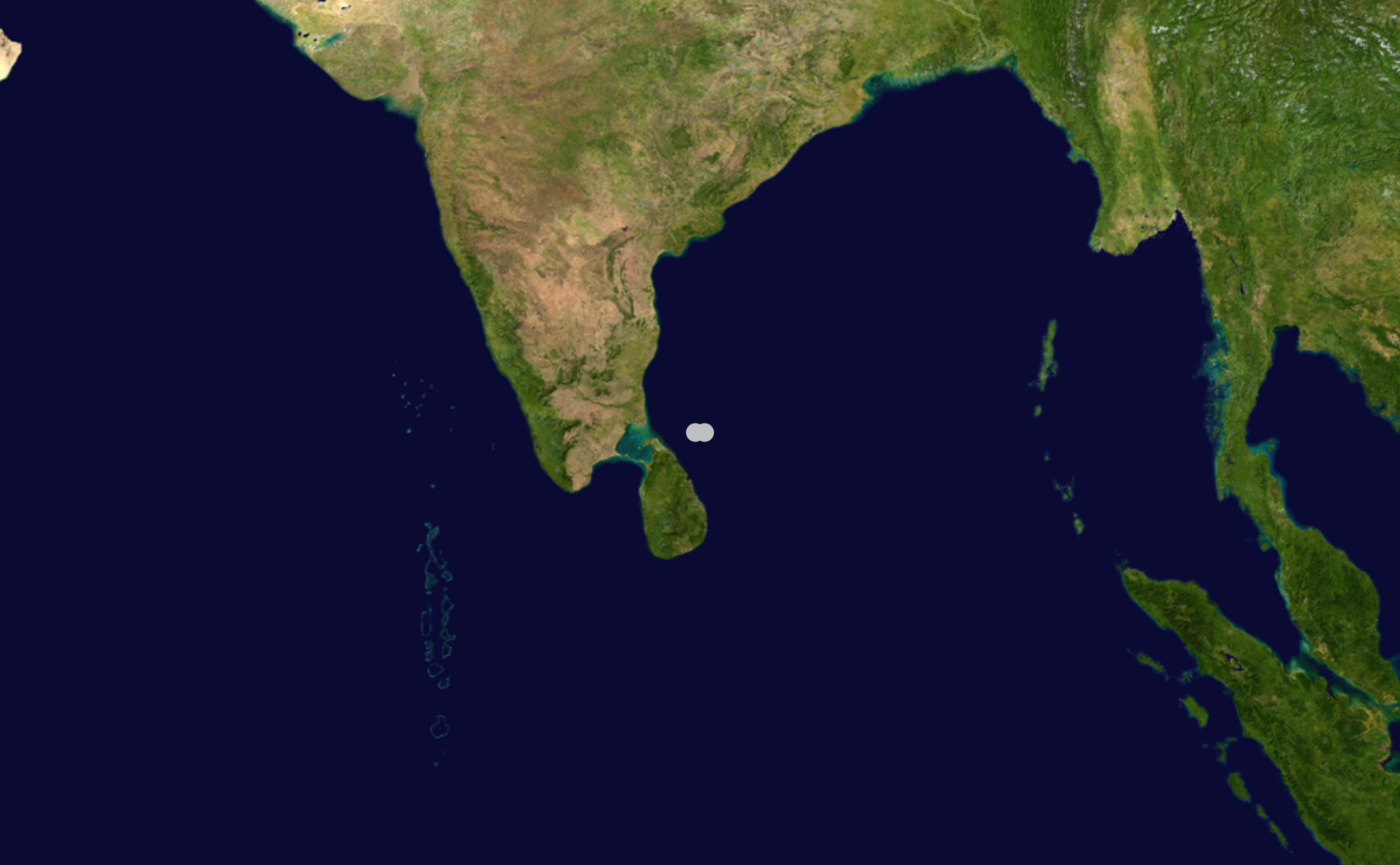
- Duration: November 10 – November 12
- Peak intensity: Winds not specified;

On November 7, an area of low pressure over the Bay of Bengal formed and gradually moved towards India. By November 9, it was located just of the Coromandel Coast. The following day, it deepened into a depression while situated off the northern edge of Ceylon. Becoming nearly stationary, the system failed to develop and soon weakened into a remnant low. The low dissipated early on November 12. Heavy rains fell across much of Madras State in association with the system; a 24‑hour total of 240 mm (9.4 in) was reported in Nagapattinam. These rains triggered significant flooding that disrupted travel and communications. Severe damage took place in Madurai where 10,000 people were left homeless. Overall, five people were killed and 150,000 were left homeless.

=== Cyclonic Storm Thirteen ===
- Cyclonic storm (IMD)
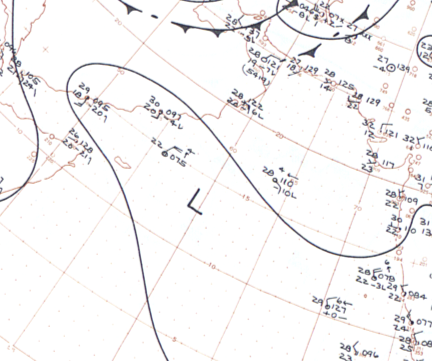
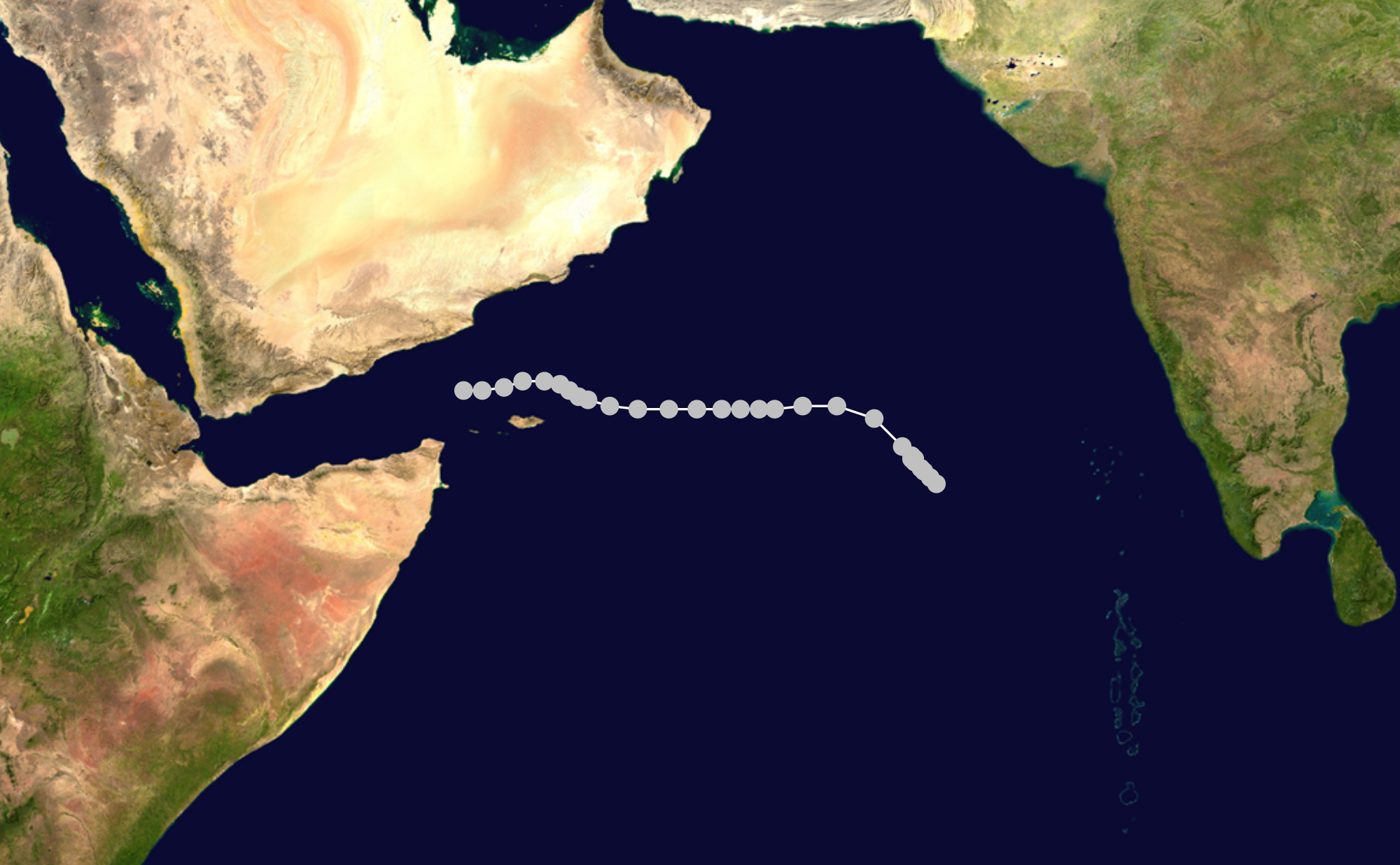
- Duration: November 17 – November 23
- Peak intensity: 75 km/h (45 mph) (3-min); 994 hPa (mbar)

On November 14, an area of low pressure formed to the west of Lakshadweep. Tracking generally westward, it eventually developed into a depression three days later. Gradual intensification took place over the following two days, with the system becoming a cyclonic storm on November 19. On November 20, the system attained its peak intensity with winds of 75 km/h (45 mph) and a minimum pressure of 994 mbar (hPa; 29.35 inHg). Continuing westward, the cyclone entered the Gulf of Aden on November 22 before becoming nearly stationary. During this time, it weakened to a depression before dissipating the following day.

=== Cyclonic Storm Fourteen ===
- Cyclonic storm (IMD)
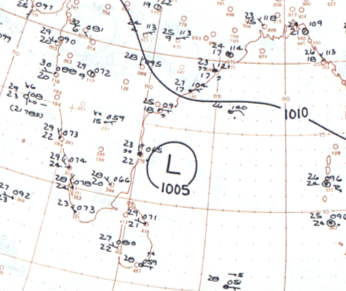
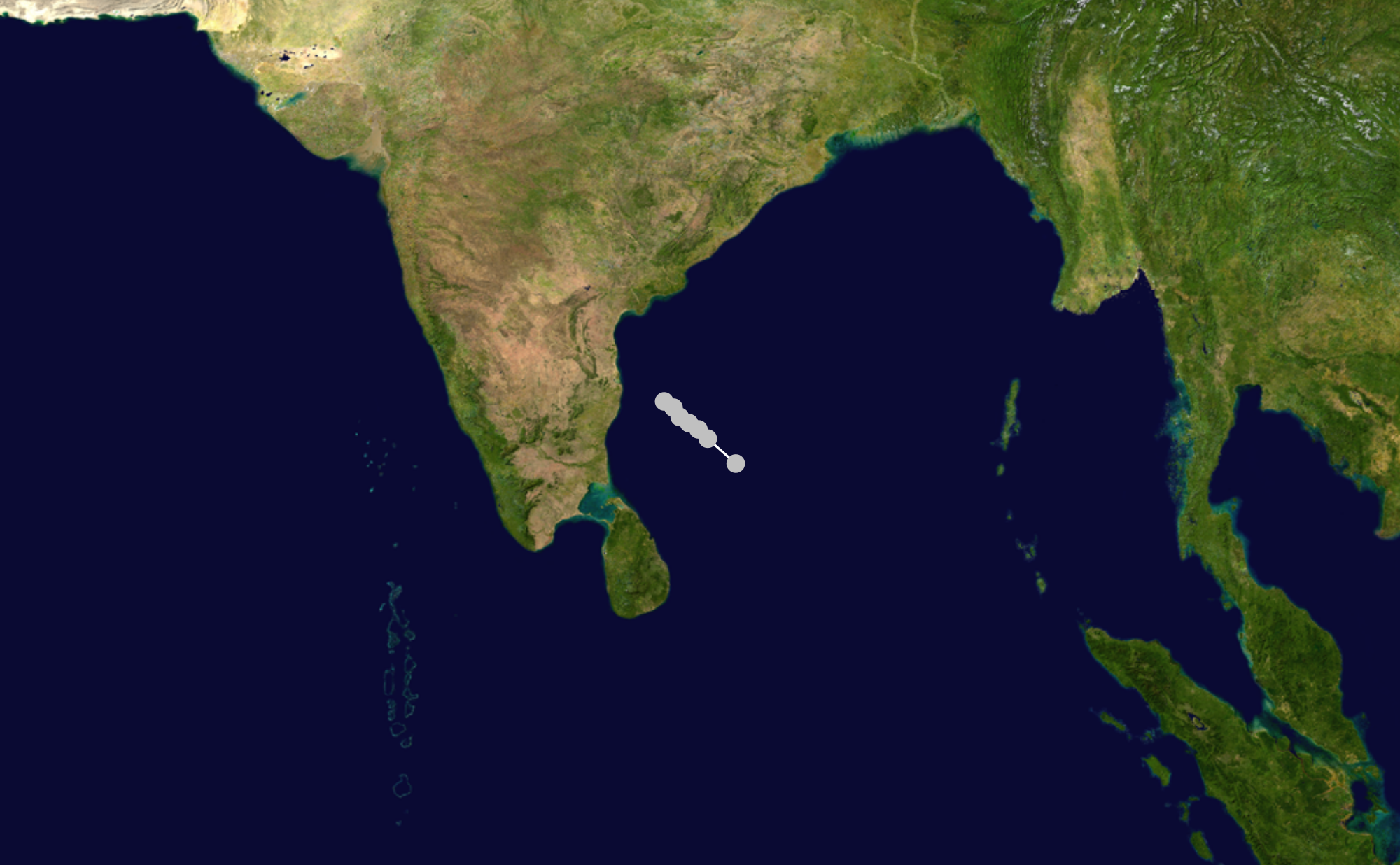
- Duration: November 18 – November 21
- Peak intensity: Winds not specified; 996 hPa (mbar)

A well-defined area of low pressure was identified over the southwestern Bay of Bengal on November 17. The following day, the system developed into a depression as it moved slowly northwestward. On November 20, as it neared the coast of Tamil Nadu, it intensified into a cyclonic storm, with gusts estimated as high as 135 km/h (84 mph). Shortly thereafter, it made landfall near Chennai. In nearby Tambaram, a pressure of 995.7 mbar (hPa; 29.40 inHg) was recorded, the lowest in relation to the cyclone. A small storm, it quickly weakened once onshore and was last noted early on November 21 as a dissipating low.

Heavy rains impacted most of southern Madras State, with a maximum daily total of 110 mm (4.3 in) in Punalur. The most significant damage took place in Madras City where gale-force winds uprooted trees and disrupted transport and communications. Many poorly constructed homes were damaged or destroyed by the storm, leaving numerous low-income families homeless.

=== Depression Fifteen ===
- Depression (IMD)
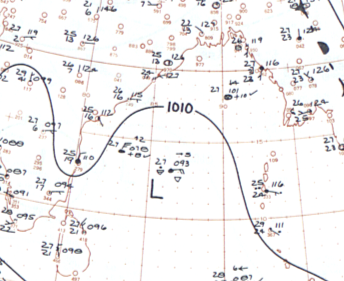
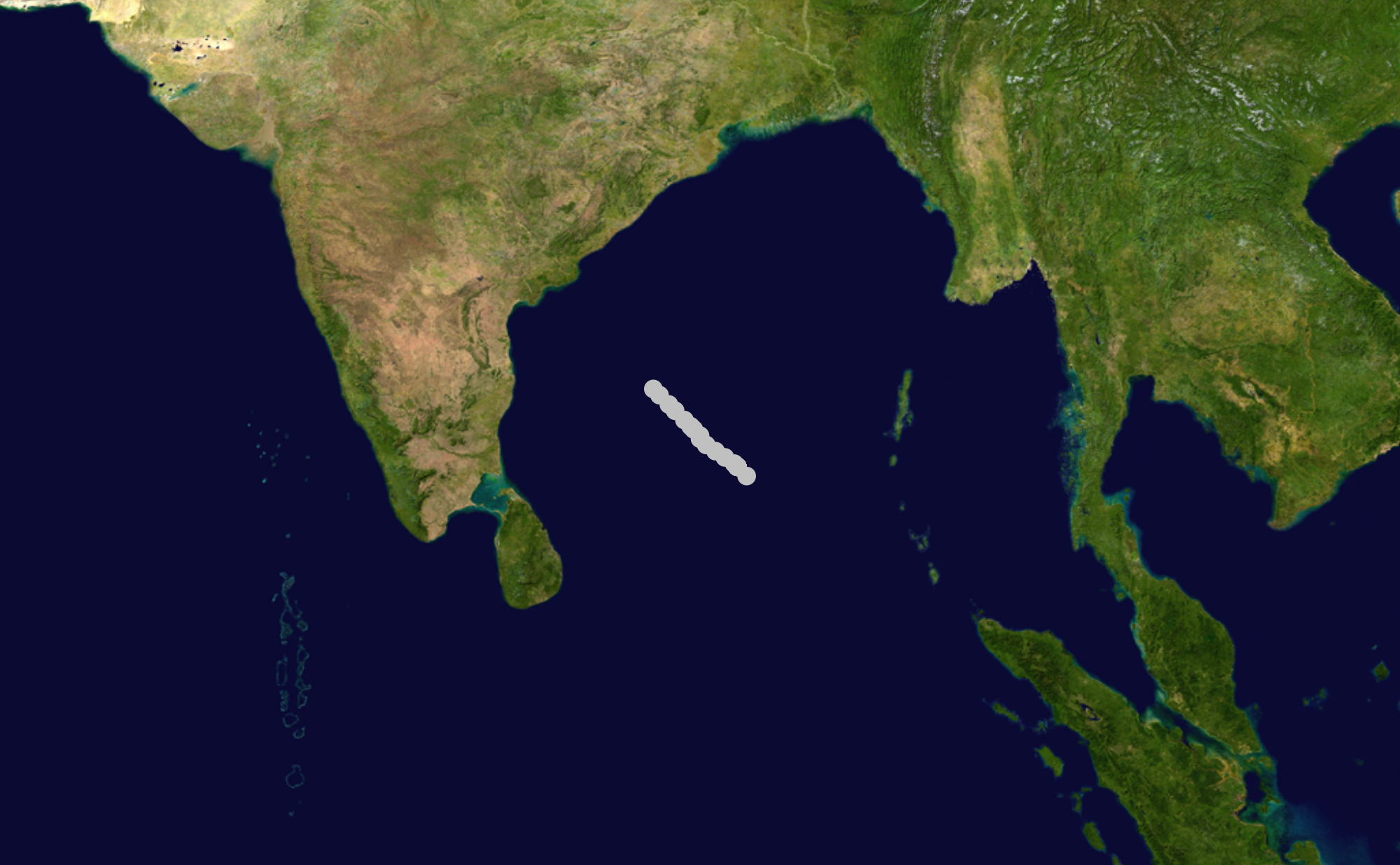
- Duration: November 26 – December 3
- Peak intensity: 55 km/h (35 mph) (3-min);

On November 24, the SS Rajula sailed under a well-defined trough over the southwest Bay of Bengal and reported 55 km/h (35 mph) winds. Two days later, a tropical wave interacted with the system and resulted in the development of a depression. Over the following several days, the system drifted northwestward without change in intensity. By December 3, it degenerated into a remnant low, ultimately tracking over southern India, near Circars, on December 4 before dissipating. The system brought locally heavy rains to parts of the Andaman Islands and Andhra Pradesh.

== Season effects ==
This is a table of all storms in the 1960 North Indian Ocean cyclone season. It mentions all of the season's storms and their names, durations, peak intensities (according to the IMD storm scale), areas affected, damages, and death totals. Damage and death totals include the damage and deaths caused when that storm was a precursor wave or extratropical low, and all of the damage figures are in 1960 USD.

| Name | Dates | Peak intensity | | | Areas affected | Damage (USD) | Deaths | Refs |
| Name | Dates | Category | Wind speed | Pressure | Areas affected | Damage (USD) | Deaths | Refs |
|---|---|---|---|---|---|---|---|---|
| One | May 10–19 | Very severe cyclonic storm | 120 km/h (75 mph) | 974 hPa (28.76 inHg) | Maldives, Ceylon, South India | Minimal | 0 | |
| Two | May 26–29 | Deep depression | 75 km/h (45 mph) | 988 hPa (29.18 inHg) | East India, Northeast India, East Pakistan | Unknown | 7 | |
| Three | June 29 – July 4 | Deep depression | N/A | N/A | East India, North India | Unknown | 0 | |
| Four | July 2–5 | Depression | 75 km/h (45 mph) | 991 hPa (29.26 inHg) | Gujarat | Unknown | 35 | |
| Five | August 8–10 | Depression | 30 km/h (20 mph) | 996 hPa (29.41 inHg) | East India, North India | Unknown | 0 | |
| Six | August 12–20 | Deep depression | 45 km/h (30 mph) | N/A | East India, Northeast India, North India | Millions | 65 | |
| Seven | August 24–28 | Depression | N/A | N/A | East India, Northeast India, North India | 9.24 million | >55 | |
| Eight | September 24–28 | Deep depression | 55 km/h (35 mph) | N/A | East India, Northeast India | Minimal | 0 | |
| Nine | October 5–12 | Severe cyclonic storm | 110 km/h (70 mph) | 986 hPa (29.12 inHg) | Thailand, Burma, East Pakistan, Northeast India | Unknown | ~6,000 | |
| Ten | October 27 – November 1 | Very severe cyclonic storm | 150 km/h (95 mph) | 967 hPa (28.56 inHg) | East Pakistan, Northeast India, Burma | Unknown | 14,174 | |
| Eleven | November 7–10 | Depression | 45 km/h (30 mph) | N/A | Madras State | None | 0 | |
| Twelve | November 10–12 | Shallow depression | N/A | N/A | Ceylon, Madras State | Unknown | 5 | |
| Thirteen | November 17–23 | Cyclonic storm | 75 km/h (45 mph) | 994 hPa (29.35 inHg) | None | None | 0 | |
| Fourteen | November 18–21 | Cyclonic storm | N/A | 996 hPa (29.41 inHg) | South India | Unknown | 0 | |
| Fifteen | November 26 – December 3 | Depression | 55 km/h (35 mph) | N/A | Andaman Islands, Andhra Pradesh | None | 0 | |
Season aggregates
| 15 systems | May 10 – December 3 | | 150 km/h (95 mph) | 967 hPa (28.56 inHg) | | >9.24 million | 20,341 | |

== See also ==
- North Indian Ocean tropical cyclone
- List of tropical cyclone records
- 1960 Atlantic hurricane season
- 1960 Pacific hurricane season
- 1960 Pacific typhoon season
- Australian region cyclone seasons: 1959–60 1960–61
- South Pacific cyclone seasons: 1959–60 1960–61
- South-West Indian Ocean cyclone seasons: 1959–60 1960–61
