= Nagri, Chhattisgarh =

Nagri
- Town
- Location in Chhattisgarh, India Nagri (India)
- Coordinates: 20.341247°N 81.959553°E
- Country: India
- State: Chhattisgarh
- District: Dhamtari

Population (2011)
  - Total: 13,308
- Time zone: UTC+5:30 (IST)
- PIN: 493778
- Area code: 07700
- Vehicle registration: CG 05

Nagri is a town and nagar panchayat in the Dhamtari district of the Indian state of Chhattisgarh. It is located 64 kilometers from the district headquarters, Dhamtari, and 145 kilometres from the state capital of Chhattisgarh, Raipur.

== Geography ==
Mukundpur, Malhari, Sihawa, Bhitarras, and Goregaon villages are nearby. Nagri is surrounded by Narharpur Tehsil to its west, Gariyaband Tehsil to its north, Baderajpur Tehsil to its south and Mainpur Tehsil to its east.

Nearby cities include Kanker, Dhamtari, Gobranawapara, Gariyaband and Umarkote.

Nagri is covered by jungles and mountains and the Mahnadi river, sometimes called the 'lifeline of Chhattisgarh', originates from Sihawa Hills, 8 kilometres from Nagri.

== Demographics ==
As of the 2011 India census, Nagri had a population of 13,308. Males and females each constitute 50%. Nagri had an average literacy rate of 67%, higher than the national average of 59.5%; its literacy rate for male is 79% and for female is 56%. As of 2011, 15% of Nagri's population was under 6 years of age. Residents speak Chhattisgarhi and/or Hindi.

== Education ==
Nagri hosts 6 schools and 3 colleges:

- Sringee Rishi Higher Secondary School
- Government Higher Secondary School
- Anand Marg School
- Sarswati Shishu Mandir School
- Genius Public Higher Secondary School
- Mahanadi Academy
- Government Sukhram Nage College Nagri (Chhipli)
- Diet Nagri
- Alshams Infotech Nagri

== Attractions ==
Various temples and natural sites attract visitors, such as:

- River Mahanadi, the 'lifeline of Chhattisgarh', is sourced from Sihawa Hill, 8 kilometres away from Nagri.
- Karneshwar Temple, made by the King Karnraj, is a popular attraction for tourists situated at Deopur, 5 kilometres away from Nagri.
- Sringee Rishi Ashram, at the top of the Sihawa Hill, 8 kilometres away from Nagri.
- Santa Devi Ashram is also situated at the top of Sihawa Hill.
- Maa Sheetla Temple is situated at Bhitarras, 6.5 kilometres away from Nagri.
- Mata Mahamai Temple is situated at Farsiyan, 9 kilometres away from Nagri.
