= 1959–60 South-West Indian Ocean cyclone season =

Cyclone season in the Southwest Indian Ocean

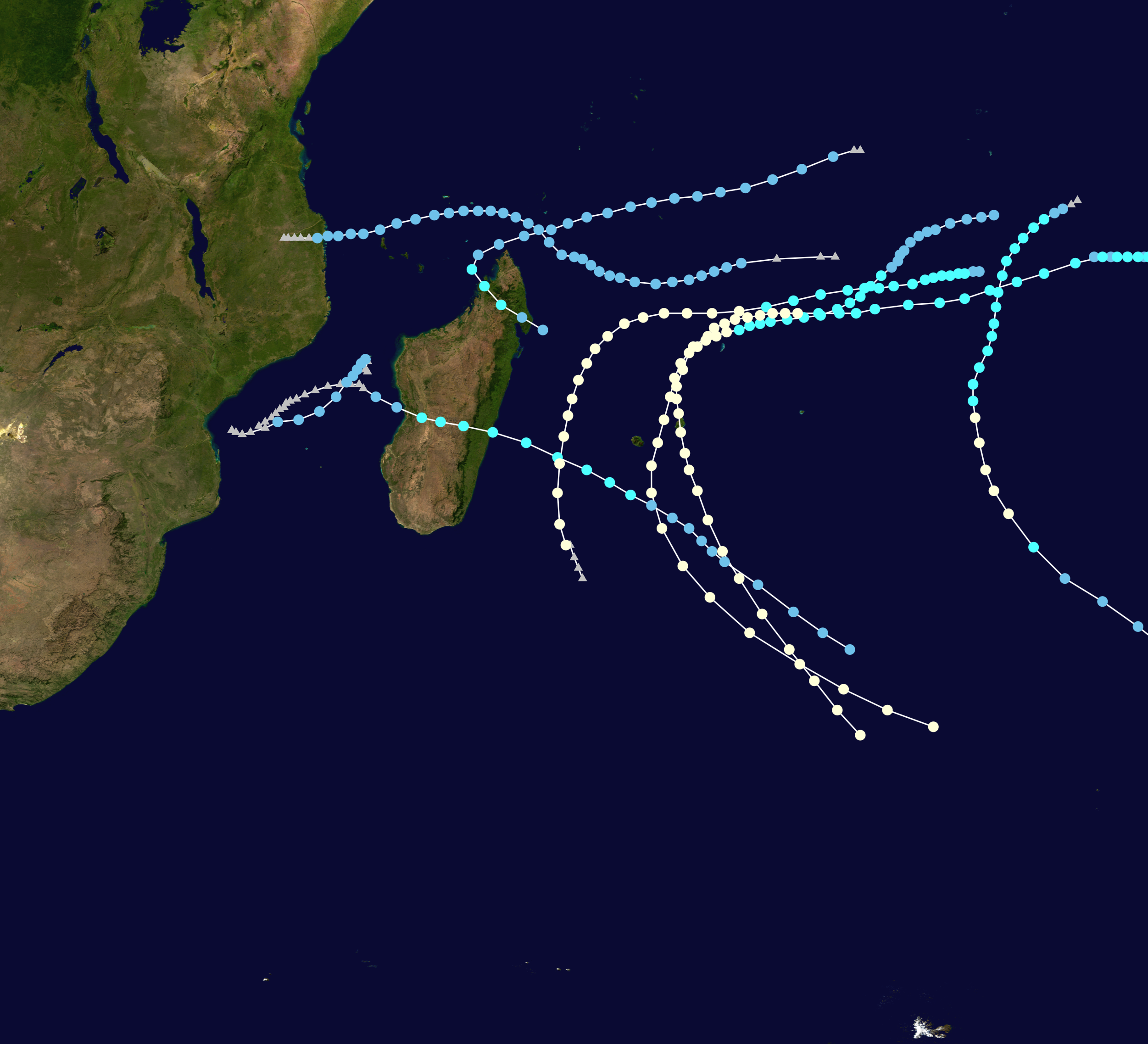
- Season summary map

Seasonal boundaries
- First system formed: October 27, 1959
- Last system dissipated: April 7, 1960

Strongest storm
- Name: Carol
  - Lowest pressure: 943 hPa (mbar)

Seasonal statistics
- Total depressions: 9
- Tropical cyclones: 4
- Total fatalities: 50
- Total damage: $95 million (1960 USD)

Related articles
- 1959–60 Australian region cyclone season; 1959–60 South Pacific cyclone season

The 1959–60 South-West Indian Ocean cyclone season featured the beginning of tropical cyclone naming in the basin.

== Systems ==
=== November tropical cyclone ===
A tropical cyclone was observed northeast of Madagascar on November 26. The storm moved westward, passing north of the island on December 6. Two days later, the storm moved through the Comoros. On December 9, the cyclone struck northeastern Mozambique, dissipating soon after.

=== December tropical cyclone ===
On December 26, a tropical cyclone was first observed west of Diego Garcia. The system moved westward at first, passing north of Tromelin Island on December 30. The track shifted to the southwest, bringing the storm between Madagascar and Réunion. The storm was last observed on January 4, moving southward away from land.

=== Tropical Cyclone Alix ===
- Category 1 tropical cyclone (SSHWS)
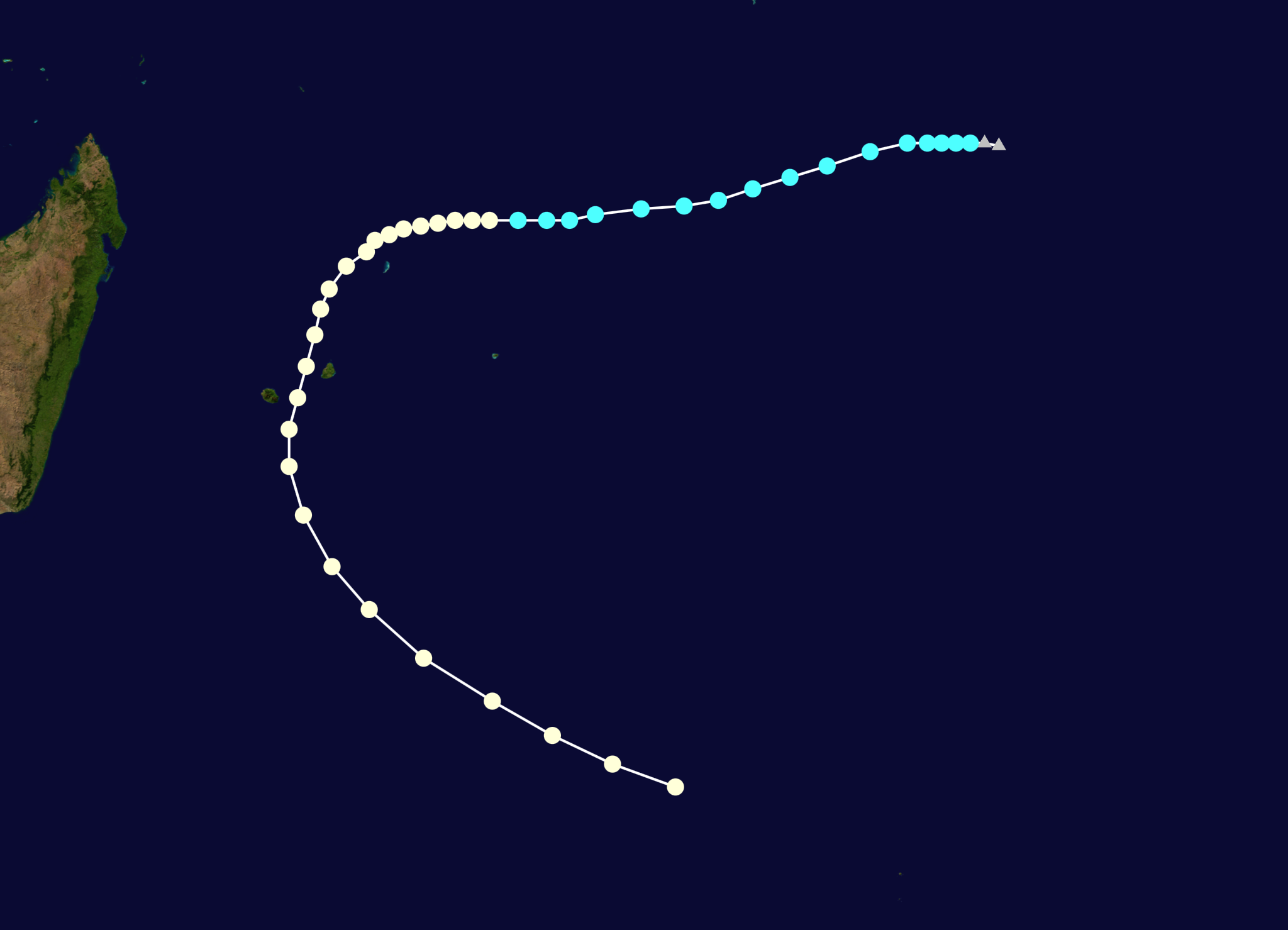
- Duration: January 10 – January 21
- Peak intensity: 120 km/h (75 mph) (1-min); <970 hPa (mbar)

A tropical cyclone developed south of Diego Garcia on January 10, which would eventually become Cyclone Alix, the first named storm in the basin. The storm moved westward for several days, eventually moving near St. Brandon on January 17. After turning southward, Cyclone Alix passed between Mauritius and Réunion on January 19, producing wind gusts of 200 km/h (120 mph), and a barometric pressure of 970 mbar (29 inHg). The storm turned to the southeast and was last observed on January 21.

During its passage near Mauritius, Cyclone Alix killed eight people, and injured more than 100 others. The cyclone destroyed more than 20,000 huts and buildings, leaving 21,000 people homeless. Rainfall on the island reached 168 mm (6.6 in).

=== Tropical Cyclone Carol ===
- Category 1 tropical cyclone (SSHWS)
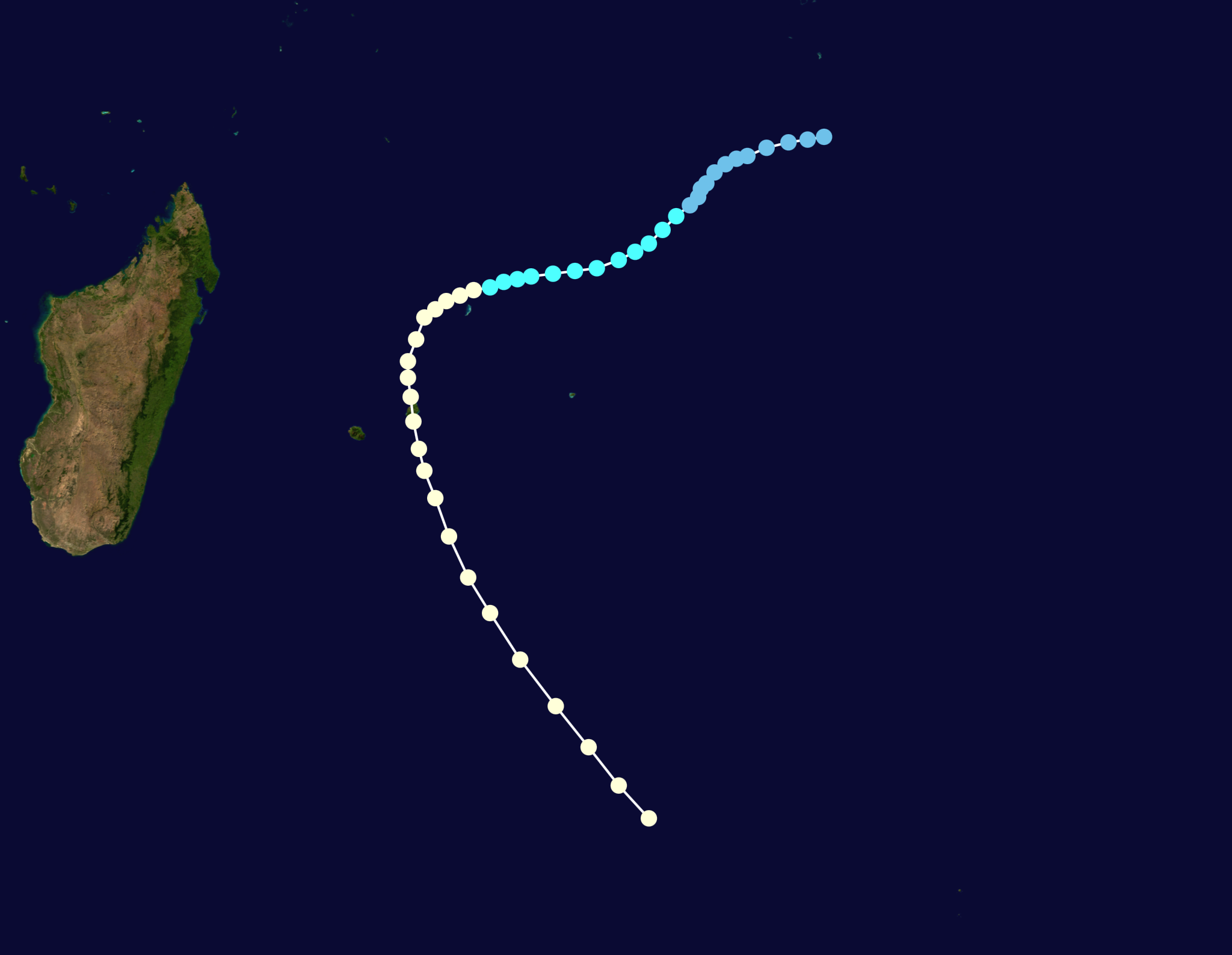
- Duration: February 20 – March 2
- Peak intensity: 120 km/h (75 mph) (1-min); 943 hPa (mbar)

On February 27, 1960, Cyclone Carol struck Mauritius, producing wind gusts of 256 km/h (159 mph), the strongest on record at the time and only surpassed by Cyclone Gervaise in 1975. Carol killed 42 people on Mauritius and seriously injured 95 others. The storm destroyed or seriously damaged about 100,000 houses, leaving over 15% of the island's population homeless, or over 100,000 people, of whom 70,000 stayed in emergency shelters. The high winds also wrecked about 60% of the sugar crop. Storm damage was estimated at RS450 million (US$95 million). King's African Rifles personnel and the Red Cross distributed relief supplies in its aftermath.

=== Tropical Depression Diane ===
- Tropical storm (SSHWS)
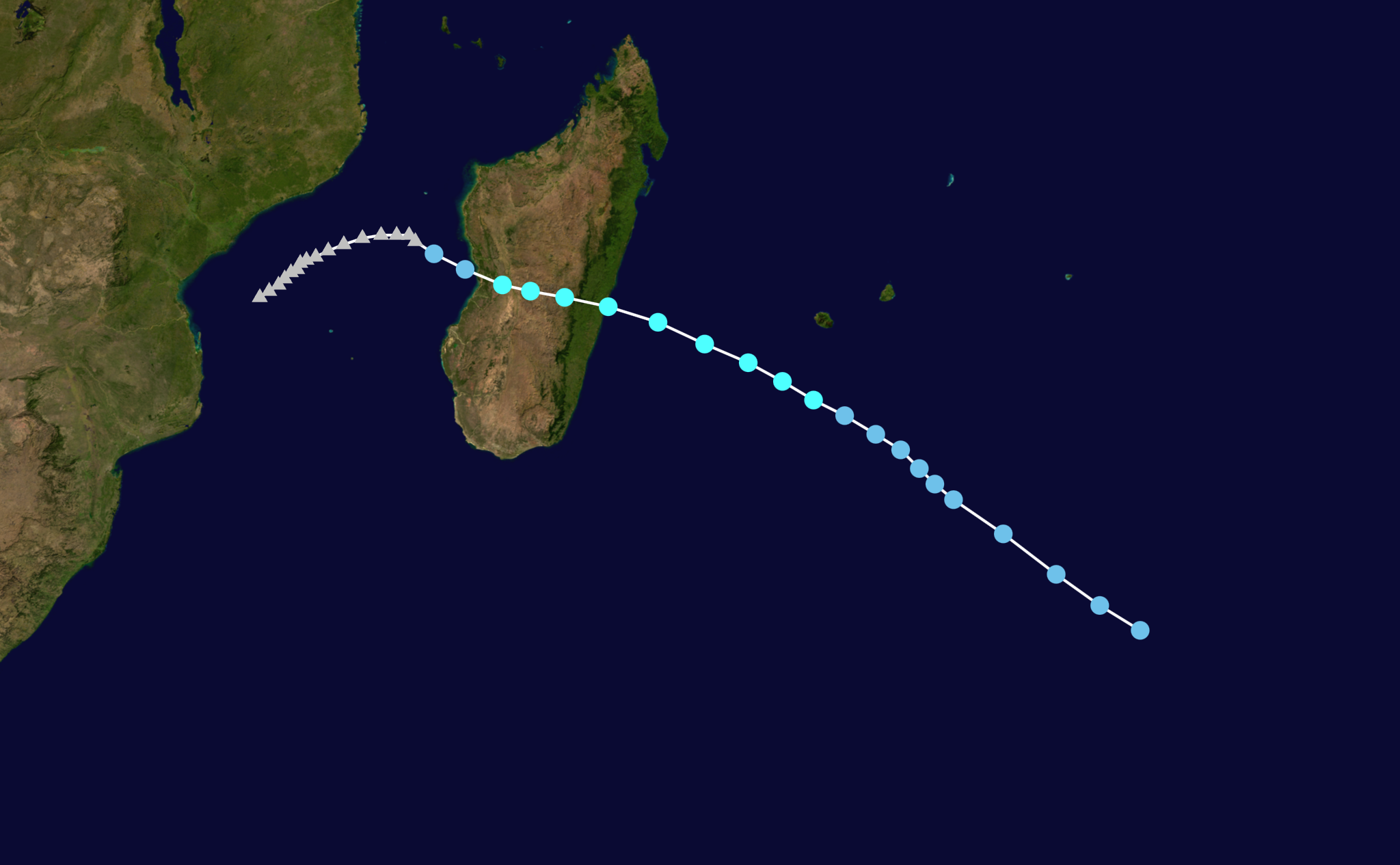
- Duration: March 18 – March 28
- Peak intensity: 65 km/h (40 mph) (1-min);

Tropical Depression Diane formed in the southwestern Mozambique Channel on March 18. It moved northeastward and later eastward, striking western Madagascar north of Morondava on March 22. Diane crossed the island and proceeded to the southeast over the Indian Ocean. On March 24, the depression passed southwest of Réunion, and was last observed four days later.

=== Tropical Depression Elise ===
- Category 1 tropical cyclone (SSHWS)
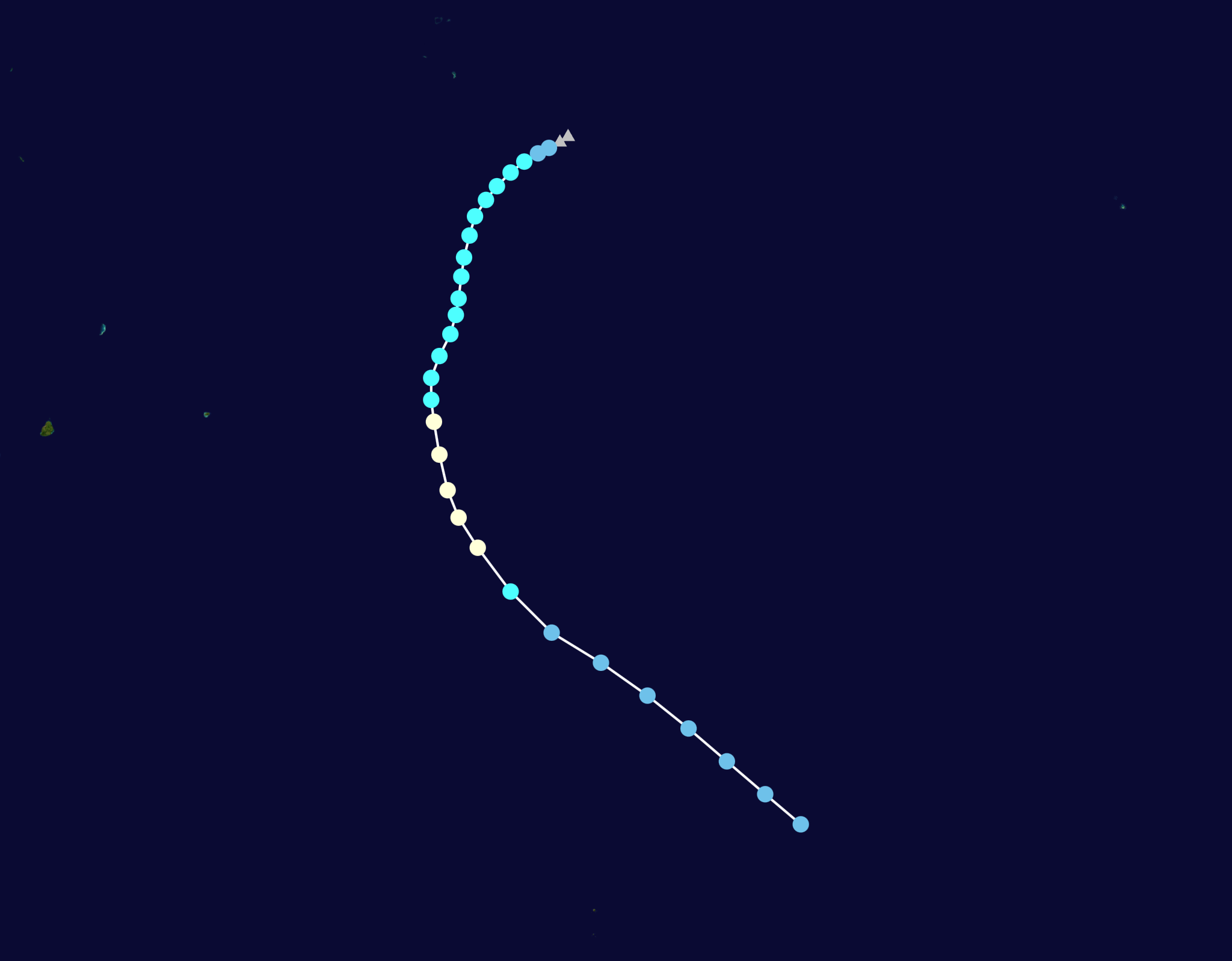
- Duration: March 30 – April 7
- Peak intensity: 120 km/h (75 mph) (1-min);

The final known storm of the season – Tropical Depression Elise – developed on March 30, southeast of Diego Garcia. Elise moved southwestward and gradually turned more to the south, attaining estimated winds of 120 km/h (75 mph). After the storm accelerated southeastward, it was last observed on April 7 departing the tropics.

=== Other storms ===
A tropical depression was first observed northeast of Madagascar on October 27. On November 2, the storm struck northern Madagascar, and dissipated three days later.

From November 20–26, a tropical depression existed in the northeast portion of the basin. The system moved west, then south, and again to the west before dissipating.

From January 15–18, a tropical depression existed near the Comoros. Tropical Depression Brigitte formed in the Mozambique Channel on January 28, near Juan de Nova Island. It moved to the west-southwest, and was last noted on February 1.

== See also ==
- Atlantic hurricane seasons: 1959, 1960
- Eastern Pacific hurricane seasons: 1959, 1960
- Western Pacific typhoon seasons: 1959, 1960
- North Indian Ocean cyclone seasons: 1959, 1960
