= Ramgati Upazila =

Ramgati রামগতি
- Upazila
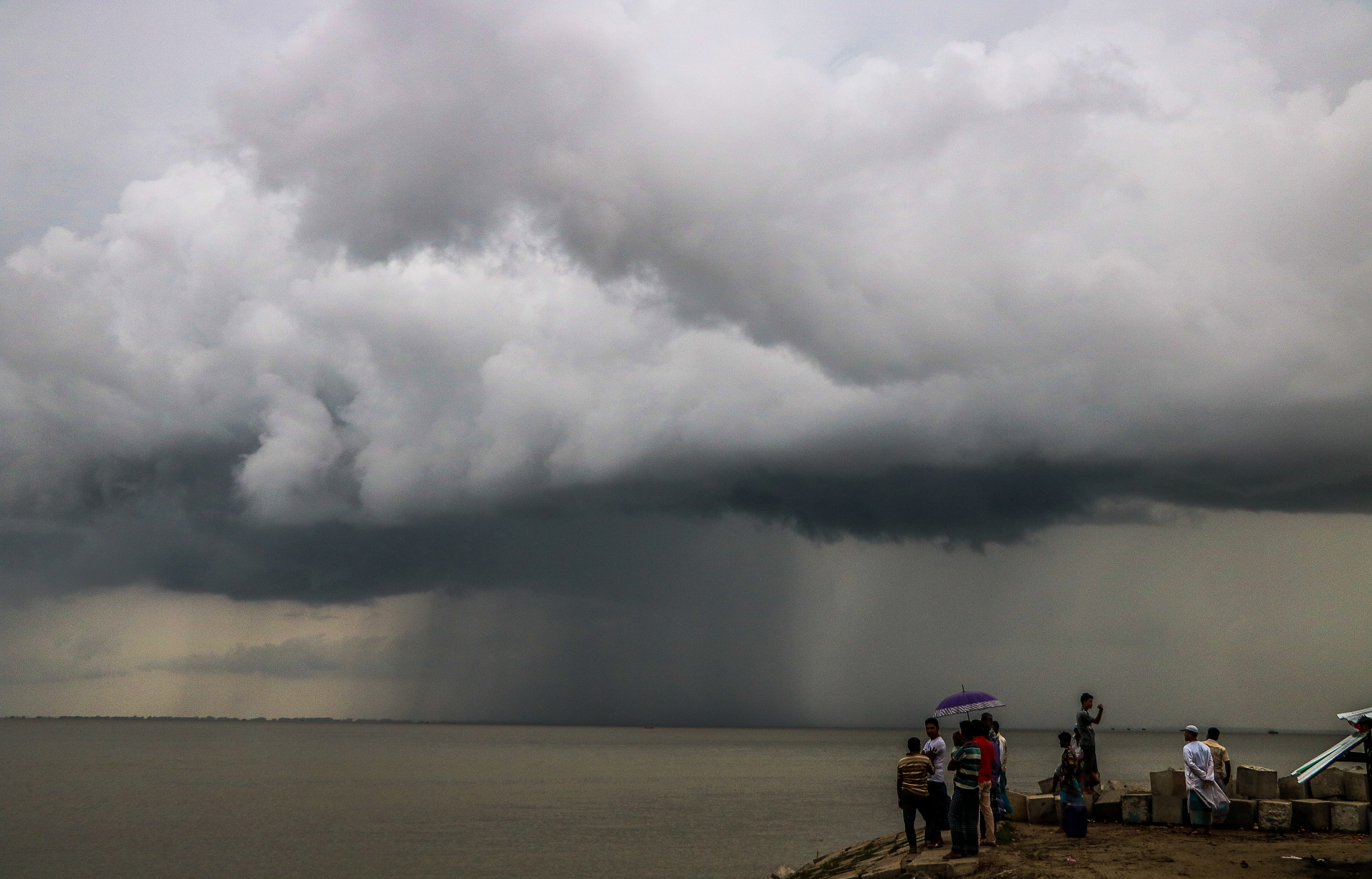
- Meghna River at Ramgati

- Coordinates: 22°36.3′N 90°59.8′E
- Country: Bangladesh
- Division: Chittagong
- District: Lakshmipur

Government
  - Upazila Chairman: Sharafuddin Azad

Area
  - Total: 279.89 km^{2} (108.07 sq mi)

Population (2022)
  - Total: 278,924
  - Density: 996.55/km^{2} (2,581.0/sq mi)
- Time zone: UTC+6 (BST)
- Postal code: 3730
- Area code: 03823
- Website: ramgati.lakshmipur.gov.bd

Ramgati Upazila mauza geocode map

Ramgati (Bengali: রামগতি, romanized: Ramgôti) is an upazila (sub-district) of Lakshmipur District in Bangladesh, part of the Chattogram Division. The government of Bangladesh plans to build an airport in this upazila.

== History ==
Ramgati is home to historic infrastructure such as the Bedar Bakhsh Mosque in Borokheri. The origin of Ramgati is said to have been from a man named Ramkrishna who had a large mercantile centre in the area known as a gôdi in the Bengali language. From this, the area came to be known as Ramer gadi (meaning Ram's godi) and was later corrupted into Ramgati. Initially, a thana was established in the Borokheri Union in 1862. In 1933, the Baluchar Islamia Senior Alim Madrasa was founded. Five years later, the Char Alexander Alia Madrasa opened.

In 1957, the government of Pakistan's Irrigation Department constructed the earthen 13.68 km Meghna Cross-Dam I across a major branch of the Meghna River which flowed between Ramgati and the Noakhali mainland. As a result, river flow was diverted westwards and by 1965, 207 km^{2} of land was reclaimed. In October 1960, a severe cyclonic storm affected Ramgati leading to 3,500 deaths.

During the Bangladesh War of Independence in 1971, a brawl took place in Zamindar Hat between Bengali fighters against the Pakistan Army soldiers and its collaborating Razakars leading to the death of 17 Pakistan Army soldiers and numerous Razakars. On the night of 3 December, a Mitra Bahini tank arrived to Ramgati and the Pakistani soldiers and their allies fled the area leading to the capture of Ramgati in 4 December. In 1972, the Borokheri Thana outpost was relocated to Ramgati Bazar as a consequence of river erosion. The Ramgati Thana was upgraded to an upazila (sub-district) in 1983 as part of Hussain Muhammad Ershad's decentralisation project.

== Geography ==
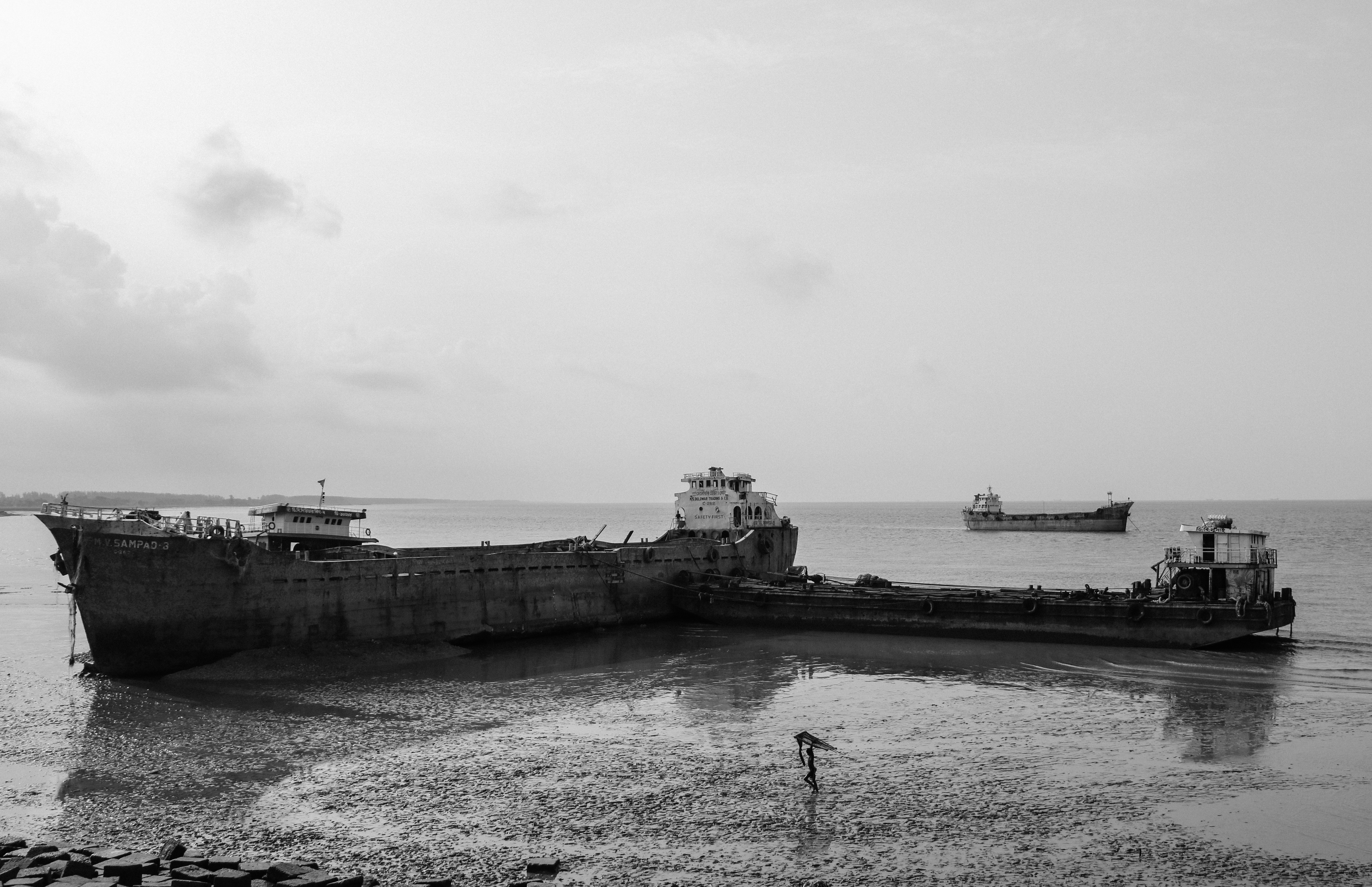
Cargo ships in Ramgati.

Ramgati is located at 22.6056°N 90.9972°E. It has a total area of 570.55 km^{2} (220.29 sq mi). The Meghna River flows into the Bay of Bengal on the west side of Ramgati Bazar, and there is a natural beach there. Ramgati is bounded by Kamalnagar Upazila to the north, Noakhali Sadar Upazila to its east, Hatiya Upazila to its south and Tazumuddin Upazila in the west.

== Demographics ==
Religions in Ramgati Upazila (2022)
Religion	Percent
Islam	96.34%
Hinduism	3.64%
Other or not stated	0.02%

According to the 2022 Bangladeshi census, Ramgati Upazila had 61,930 households and a population of 278,924. 12.72% of the population were under 5 years of age. Ramgati had a literacy rate (age 7 and over) of 65.46%: 65.58% for males and 65.35% for females, and a sex ratio of 97.22 males for every 100 females. 70,608 (25.31%) lived in urban areas.

According to the 2011 Census of Bangladesh, Ramgati Upazila had 55,644 households and a population of 261,002. 81,176 (31.10%) were under 10 years of age. Ramgati had a literacy rate (age 7 and over) of 39.3%, compared to the national average of 51.8%, and a sex ratio of 1032 females per 1000 males. 59,837 (22.93%) lived in urban areas.

According to the 1991 Bangladesh census, Ramgati had a population of 335,243. Ramgati has 59,387 households. Males constituted 51.57% of the population, and females 48.43%. The population aged 18 or over was 146,035. Ramgati had an average literacy rate of 19.9% (7+ years), against the national average of 32.4%.

== Administration ==
Ramgati Upazila is divided into Ramgati Municipality and eight union parishads: Borokheri, Char Abdullah, Char Alexandar, Char Algi, Char Badam, Char Gazi, Char Poragacha, and Char Ramiz. The union parishads are subdivided into 50 mauzas and 39 villages.

Ramgati Municipality is subdivided into 9 wards and 11 mahallas.

List of chairmen
Name	Term
Muhammad Firdaws	1985-1986
Abdul Wahid	1986-1991
Begum Ruqayyah Azad	24/2/2009-6/5/2014
Abdul Wahid	7/5/2014-7/5/2019
Sharafuddin Azad Charramizi	present

== Education and facilities ==
In 2001, Ramgati had an average literacy rate of 19.9% (7+ years), against then national average of 32.4%. Ramgati is home to 46 madrasas and 105 mosques. Some notable mosques include the Ramgati Central Jame Mosque, Bedar Bakhsh Mosque and the Char Poragacha Mosque.

== Notable people ==
- Abdur Rab Chowdhury, Supreme Court lawyer
- A. S. M. Abdur Rab, former minister and inaugural secretary-general of the Jatiya Samajtantrik Dal
- Mohammad Toaha, language activist
- Thanaullah Nuri, journalist

== See also ==
- Upazilas of Bangladesh
- Districts of Bangladesh
- Divisions of Bangladesh
