= Mahanadi =

River in East Central India

Mahanadi River
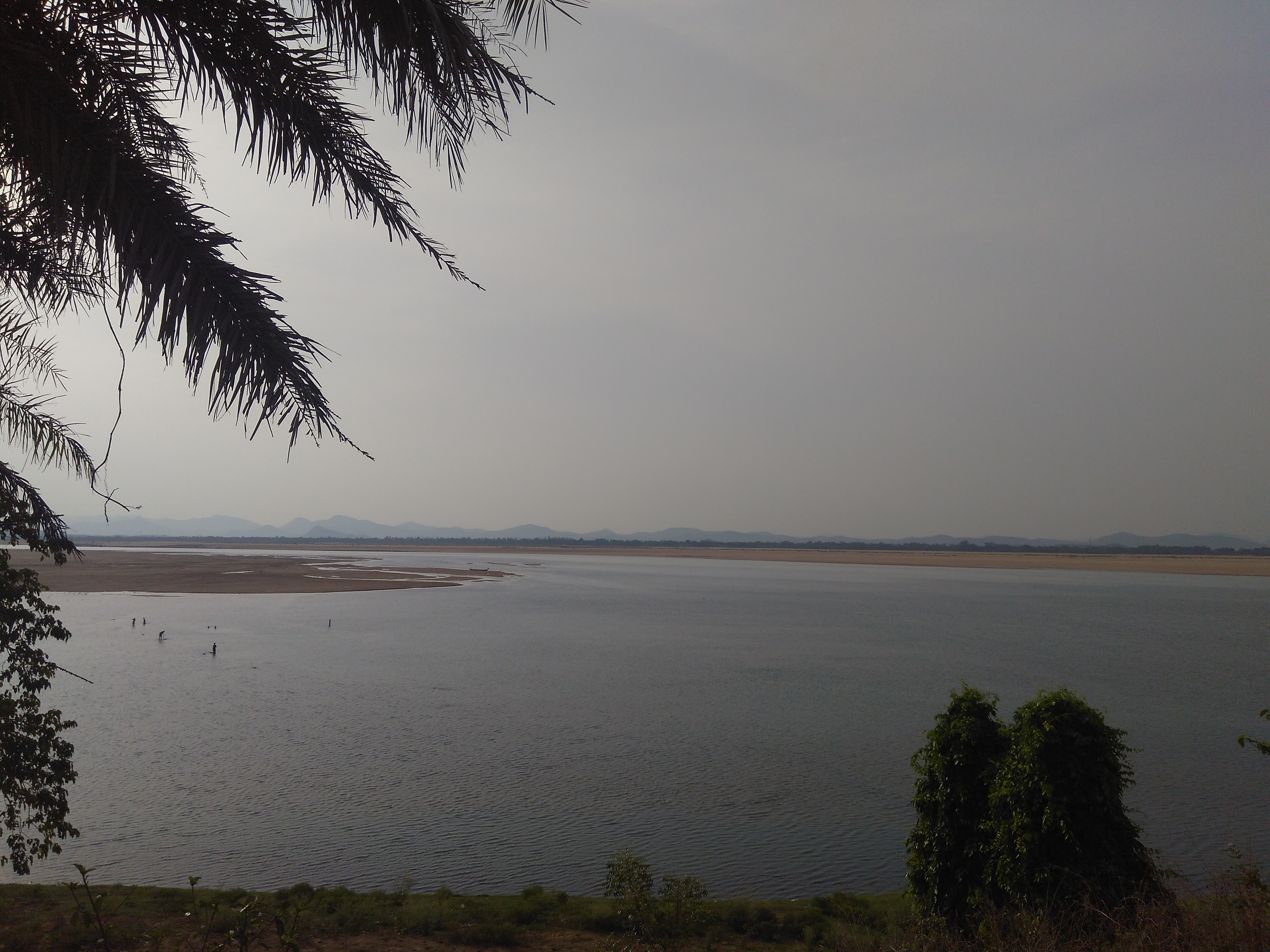
- Mahanadi in Odisha

- Map showing the Mahanadi river in a dark blue with its approximate source shown with a dot

Location
- Country: India
- States: Chhattisgarh, Odisha
- Regions: Chhattisgarh Plains, Garhjat Hills, Utkal Plains
- Administrative areas: Raipur, Janjgir, Raigarh,(Chhattisgarh), Sambalpur, Bargarh, Subarnapur, Boudh, Anugul, Cuttack, Banki, Jagatsinghpur, Nayagarh, Jharsuguda (Odisha)
- Cities: Rajim, Sambalpur, Cuttack, Sonepur, Kantilo, Boudh, Banki, Paradeep

Physical characteristics
- Source
  - location: Nagri-Sihawa, Dhamtari, Chhattisgarh, India
  - coordinates: 20.11°N 81.91°E
  - elevation: 890 m (2,920 ft)
- Mouth
  - location: False Point, Jagatsinghpur, Delta, Odisha, India
  - coordinates: 20°17′43″N 86°42′39″E
  - elevation: 0 m (0 ft)
- Length: 900 km (560 mi)
- Basin size: 132,100 km^{2} (51,000 sq mi)
- Discharge
  - location: False Point, Odisha
  - minimum: 31.9 m^{3}/s (1,125 cu ft/s)
  - maximum: 56,700 m^{3}/s (2,000,000 cu ft/s)

Basin features
- Tributaries
  - left: Seonath, Mand, Ib, Hasdeo, Kelo, Sapua
  - right: Ong, parry, Jonk, Telen, Jira (Jeera), Danta

The Mahanadi River is a major river in East Central India. It drains an area of around 132,100 square kilometres (51,000 sq mi) and has a total length of 900 kilometres (560 mi). Mahanadi is also known for the Hirakud Dam which was the first major multipurpose river valley project after India's independence in 1947. The river flows through the states of Chhattisgarh and Odisha, before finally ending in the Bay of Bengal.

== Etymology ==
The word Mahanadi is a compound of the Sanskrit words maha ("great") and nadi ("river").

== Course ==
=== Source and Upper Course ===
Like many other seasonal Indian rivers, the Mahanadi too is a combination of many mountain streams and thus its precise source is impossible to pinpoint. However its farthest headwaters lie 6 kilometres (3.7 mi) from Pharsiya village in Nagri Sihawa 442 metres (1,450 ft) above sea level about 11 km, in a dense patch of forest, south of Sihawa town in Dhamtari district of Chhattisgarh. The hills here are an extension of the Eastern Ghats and are a source of many other streams which then go on to join the Mahanadi.

For the first 100 kilometres (62 mi) of its course, the Mahanadi flows in a northerly direction and drains the Raipur district and touches eastern portions of Raipur city. It is a rather narrow river at this stage and the total width of its valley does not exceed 500–600 metres.

=== Middle course ===
After being joined by the Shivnath, the river flows in an easterly direction through the remaining part of its journey. It is joined by the Jonk and Hasdeo rivers here before entering into Odisha after covering about half of its total length. Near the city of Sambalpur, it is dammed by the longest earthen dam in the world, the Hirakud Dam. A composite structure of the earth, concrete and masonry, the dam measures 26 kilometres (16 mi) including the Dykes. It spans two hills — the Lamdungri on the left and the Chandili Dunguri on the right. It also forms the biggest artificial lake in Asia, with a reservoir holding 784 square kilometres (303 sq mi) at full capacity, with a shoreline of over 675 kilometres (419 mi).

After the formation of Chhattisgarh State, the major portion of Mahanadi basin now lies in Chhattisgarh. Presently, only 169 square kilometres (65 sq mi) basin area of Hasdeo River in Anuppur District lies in Madhya Pradesh.

Before the construction of the dam in 1953, the Mahanadi was about a mile wide at Sambalpur and carried massive amounts of silt, especially during the monsoon. Today, it is a rather tame river after the construction of the dam and is joined by the Ib, Ong, Tel and other minor streams. It then skirts the boundaries of the Baudh district and forces a tortuous way between ridges and ledges in a series of rapids until it reaches Dholpur, Odisha. The rapids end here and the river rolls towards the Eastern Ghats, forcing its way through them via the 64 kilometres (40 mi) long Satkosia Gorge. The Satakosia Gorge ends at Badamul of Nayagarh. Dense forests cover the hills flanking the river here. The river enters the Odisha plains at Naraj, about 14 kilometres (8.7 mi) from Cuttack, where it pours down between two hills that are a mile apart. A barrage has been constructed here to regulate the river's flow into Cuttack.

=== Lower Course ===
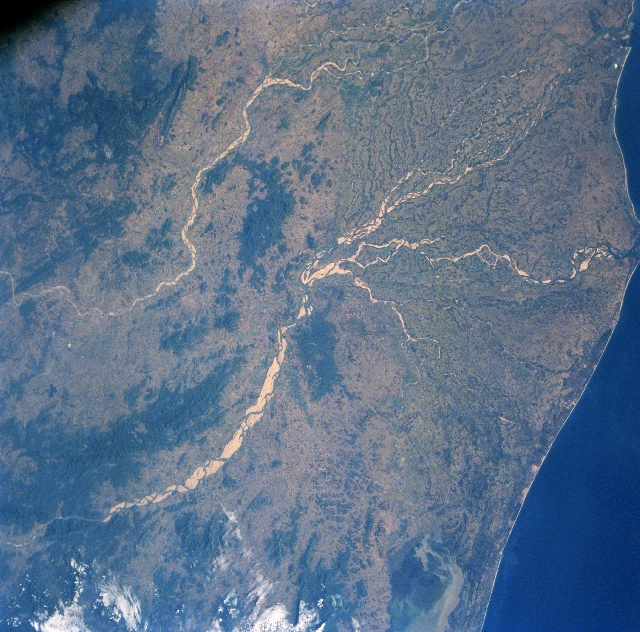
The Mahanadi River Delta at False Point.

The river traverses the Cuttack district from west to east. Just before entering Cuttack, it gives off a large distributary called the Kathjori. The city of Cuttack stands on the spit separating the two channels. The Kathjori then throws off many streams like the Kuakhai, Devi and Surua which fall into the Bay of Bengal after entering the Puri district. The Kathjori itself falls into the sea as the Jotdar. Other distributaries of Mahanadi include the Paika, Birupa River, Chitroptala river, Genguti and Lun. The Birupa then goes on to join the Brahmani River at Krushnanagar and enters the Bay of Bengal at Dhamra. The Mahanadi proper enters the sea via several channels near Paradeep at False Point, Jagatsinghpur. The combined delta of the Mahanadi's numerous distributaries and the Brahmani is one of the largest in India.

== Navigation ==
Prior to the construction of Hirakud Dam, the Mahanadi was navigable from its mouth up to Arrang, about 250 kilometres (160 mi) from its source. However numerous barrages apart from the Hirakud have put an end to that. Today, boats are restricted to the delta region and the Hirakud reservoir. Fresh water crocodiles, Ganges and Bull sharks frequent Mahanadi.

== Trade and agriculture ==
The Mahanadi is an important river in the state of Odisha. This river flows slowly for about 900 kilometres (560 mi) and deposits more silt than any other river in the Indian subcontinent.

The cities of Cuttack and Sambalpur were prominent trading places in the ancient world and the river itself has been referred to as the Manada in Ptolemy's works. However today the Mahanadi valley is best known for its fertile soil and flourishing agriculture.

== Water ==
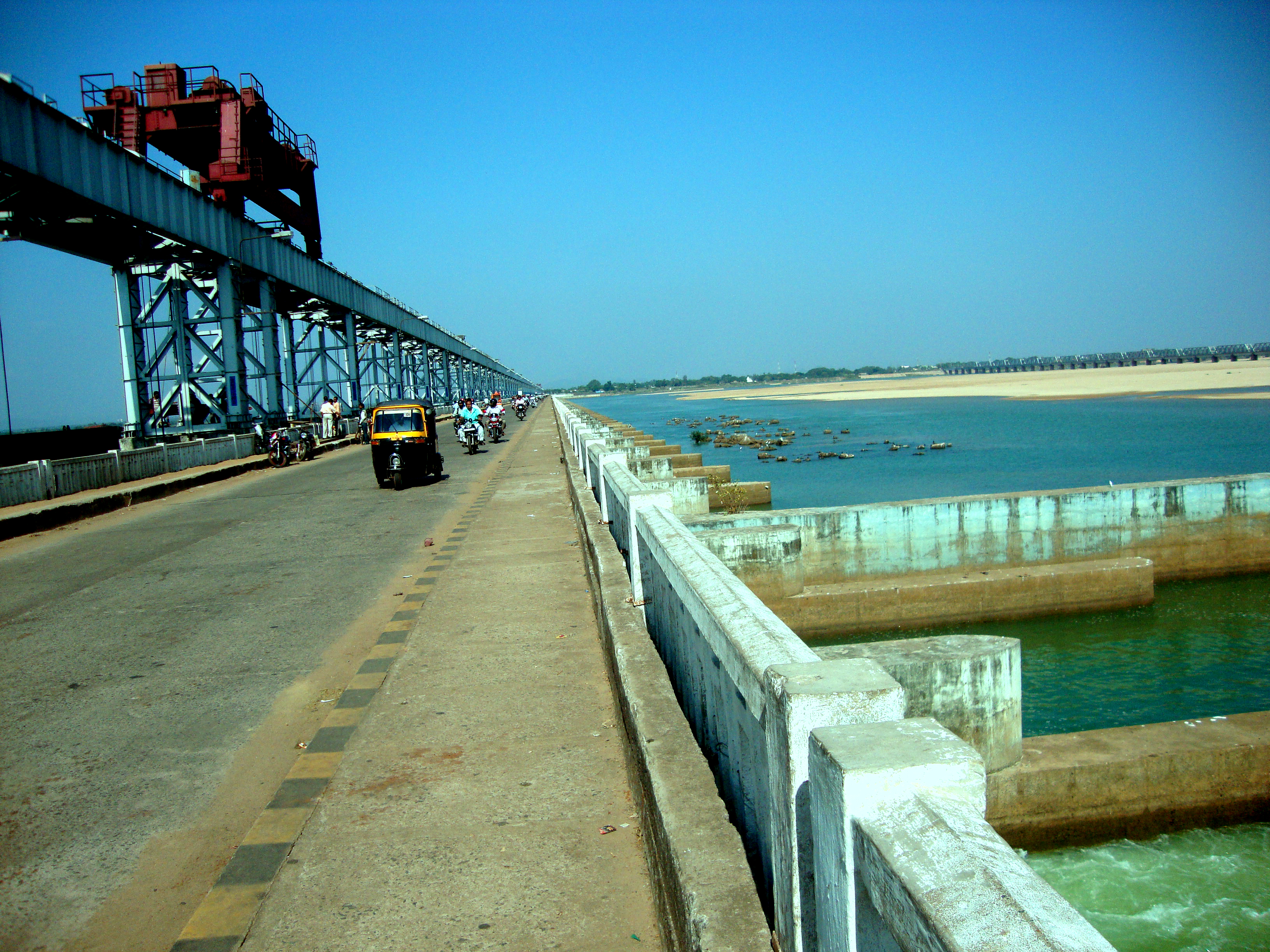
Jobra bridge on the Mahanadi

Average annual surface water potential of 66.9 km^{3} has been assessed in this basin. Out of this, 50.0 km^{3} is usable water. Culturable area in the basin is about 80,000 square kilometres (31,000 sq mi), which is 4% of the total culturable area of the country.

Present use of surface water in the basin is 17.0 km^{3}. Live storage capacity in the basin has increased significantly since independence. From just about 0.8 km^{3} in the pre-plan period, the total live storage capacity of the completed projects has increased to 8.5 km^{3}. In addition, a substantial storage quantity of over 5.4 km^{3} would be created on completion of projects under construction. Additional storage to the tune of over 11.0 km^{3} would become available on execution of projects under consideration. The hydropower potential of the basin has been assessed as 627 MW at 60% load factor.

At its peak during the monsoon, the Mahanadi has a discharge rate of 2,000,000 cubic feet (57,000 m^{3}) per second, almost as much as the much larger Ganges. However owing to its seasonal nature the river is mostly a narrow channel flanked by wide sand banks for most of the year.

== Floods ==
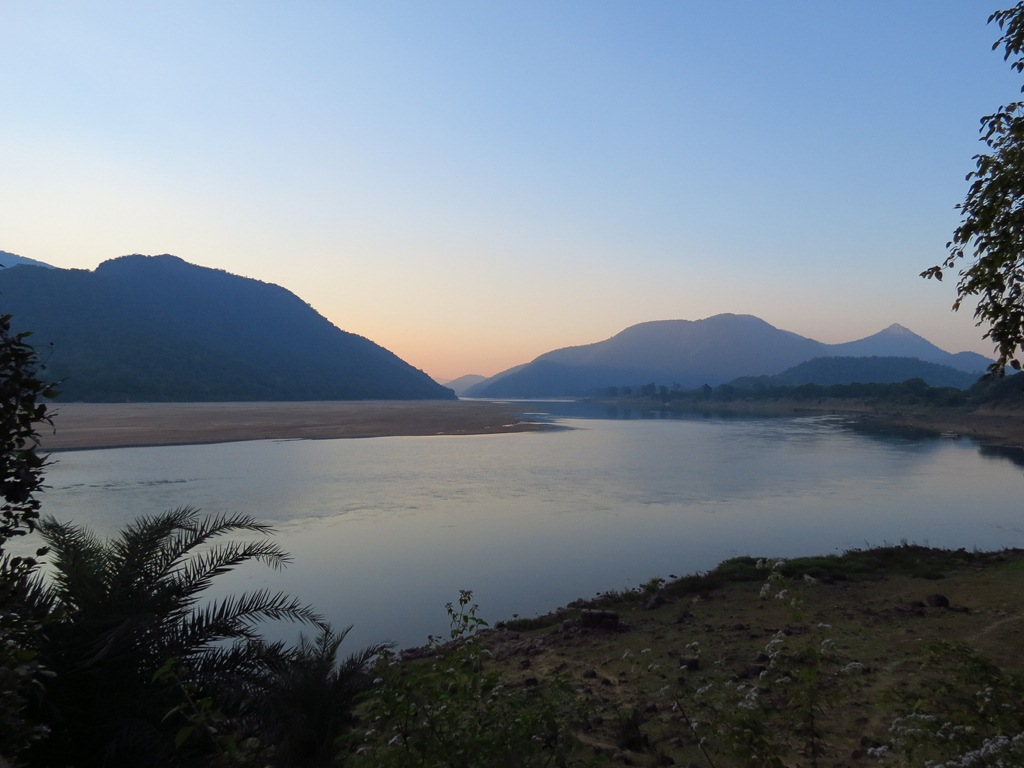
Mahanadi River near Satkosia Tiger Reserve, Odisha.

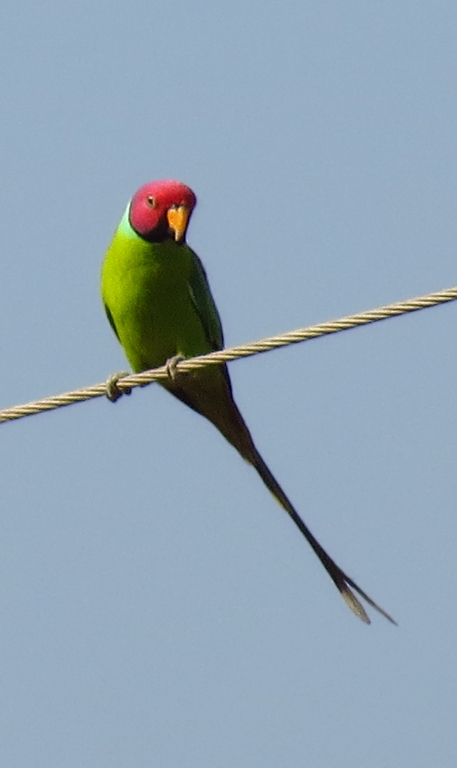
Plum-headed parakeet at Tikrapara on the bank of river Mahanadi.

The Mahanadi was notorious for its devastating floods for much of recorded history. Thus it was called The sorrow of Orissa. However the construction of the Hirakud Dam has greatly altered the situation. Today a network of canals, barrages and check dams keep the river well in control. However heavy rain can still cause large-scale flooding as evidenced in September 2008 when 16 people died as the river breached its banks.

In September 2011, heavy downpour caused flash flood and many mud dwellings in more than 25 villages above Hirakud Dam in Chhattisgarh and Odisha, which were never affected before, collapsed due to back water that could not pass through the river.

== See also ==
- The river depiction in the 1994 Tamil film Mahanadi
