= Gobra-Nawapara =

- city
- Location in Chhattisgarh, India Gobra-Nawapara (India)
- Coordinates: 20.97099°N 81.83163°E
- Country: India
- State: Chhattisgarh
- District: Raipur

Population (2011)
  - Total: 29,315

Languages
  - Official: Hindi, Chhattisgarhi
- Time zone: UTC+5:30 (IST)
- Vehicle registration: CG

Gobra-Nawapara is a city and a municipality in Raipur district in the Indian state of Chhattisgarh.

== Demographics ==
As of 2001 India census, Gobranawapara had a population of 25,604. Males constitute 50% of the population and females 50%. Gobranawapara has an average literacy rate of 66%, higher than the national average of 59.5%: male literacy is 75%, and female literacy is 56%. In Gobranawapara, 15% of the population is under 6 years of age.
