= Chitroptala River =

River in India

Chitrotpala River Hiran
- Indian River Map

Location
- Country: India
- State: Odisha

Physical characteristics
- Source: Mahanadi River
- Mouth
  - coordinates: 20°27′43.56″N 86°6′22.45″E
- Length: 20 km (12 mi)

The Chitrotpala River in Odisha state, India, is a distributary of the Mahanadi, situated in both Kendrapara and Cuttack districts.

== Course ==
The river starts from Guali/Salepur, 20 kilometres (12 mi) downstream towards Kendrapara. Within 6 to 8 kilometres (4 to 5 mi) again it subdivides into Chitroptala (main river) and Luna (distributary). Luna being the deeper one carries almost 60 percent of water of the main river in dry season. In its way the Distributary Luna further divided in to two rivers near Danpur - the main river as Luna and distributary as Karandia. These two rivers confluent near the village Karandia after flowing 30 kilometers independently. It is well observed that maximum water of Chiropatala gets carried by Luna and subsequently by Karandia for being deeper during partition. However in rainy season the equation changes when there is mammoth amounts of rain water to be evacuated. Chitroptala flows eastward approximately 80 kilometres (50 mi) and near Paradeep it joins with its tributary river Luna. It merges into the Bay of Bengal near Paradeep. It has six bridges across it in 80 kilometres (50 mi). The bridges are at Shishua, Nemala-Jaladia, Narendra pur, Gardapur, Patkura and finally near Haldia-Gada. Its distributary Luna has two major bridges; one at Katikata-Asureswara and the second one near Danpur.

The river itself is one of the major tributary of Mahanadi. It has a sandy bed, Jhaun forest, local-myth and pilgrimage prospects and sugarcane, paddy and groundnut cultivation along its course.

Salipur is the most happening place situated in the bank of Chitoptala, known for Rassagolla (an Odia cuisine), education and business.

Nemala is known in coastal Odisha for Malika-bachana (a purana) which was depicted by the saint Acyutananda five hundred years ego, since then the place is Nemala-Bata. Another place is Kuda-Nagari at its bank, which is known for Magha-Mela. In the Hindu month of Magha, thousands of pilgrims from Cuttack and Kendrapara district take the holy-dip in the river and offer tarpan to their ancestors (pitrupurush). Other places along its course are Gardpur (revenue office), Patkura (police-station) in Kendrapara district.

== Agriculture and floods ==
The river is useful to nearby villagers to cultivate winter crops and as well as summer crops. Surfaced roads have been constructed on the river embankments on both sides, which helps thousand of villagers to travel from their village to Cuttack/Bhubaneswar/Salipur. However, in rainy season the river brings havoc to the nearby villages in terms of heavy flooding. Almost in every rainy season, the river brings trauma to the villages downstream.
