= List of storms named Olive =

The name Olive has been used for a total of eleven tropical cyclones worldwide: one in the Central Pacific Ocean, nine in the Western Pacific Ocean, and one in the Southwest Indian Ocean.

Central Pacific:

- Tropical Storm Olive (1974) – didn't affect land.

Western Pacific:

- Typhoon Olive (1947) (T4715)
- Typhoon Olive (1952) (T5213) – affected Wake Island.
- Typhoon Olive (1956) (T5622) – struck the Philippines.
- Typhoon Olive (1960) (T6005, 12W) – struck the Philippines and China.
- Typhoon Olive (1963) (T6301, 05W)
- Typhoon Olive (1965) (T6520, 25W)
- Tropical Storm Olive (1968) (T6806, 09W, Edeng)
- Typhoon Olive (1971) (T7119, 19W) – struck Japan.
- Typhoon Olive (1978) (T7802, 02W, Atang) – struck the Philippines.

Southwest Indian Ocean:

- Cyclone Olive (1965)

== See also ==
- List of storms named Olivia, a similar name also used
