= List of storms named Olivia =

The name Olivia has been used for ten tropical cyclones in the eastern Pacific Ocean, and for one in the Australian region of the Indian Ocean.

In the eastern Pacific:

- Hurricane Olivia (1967) – Category 3 hurricane that struck Baja California causing significant damage
- Hurricane Olivia (1971) – Category 3 hurricane, reached Baja California as a depression; continuation of Atlantic Hurricane Irene
- Hurricane Olivia (1975) – Category 3 hurricane, caused significant damage in the Mexican state of Sinaloa
- Hurricane Olivia (1978) – Category 1 hurricane that made landfall east of Salina Cruz; continuation of Atlantic Hurricane Greta
- Hurricane Olivia (1982) – powerful Category 4 hurricane that stayed at sea, its remnants brought rain to California
- Hurricane Olivia (1994) – powerful Category 4 hurricane that stayed at sea
- Tropical Storm Olivia (2000) – strong tropical storm that stayed at sea
- Tropical Storm Olivia (2006) – weak tropical storm, formed in the open ocean
- Tropical Storm Olivia (2012) – moderate tropical storm that stayed at sea
- Hurricane Olivia (2018) – low-end Category 4 hurricane, made landfall in Hawaii as a tropical storm

In the Australian region:

- Cyclone Olivia (1996) – intense Category 4 tropical cyclone that made landfall in Western Australia; produced peak gusts of 408 km/h (254 mph)

The name Olivia was retired from further use in the region after the 1996 season.

== See also ==
- List of storms named Olive, a similar name also used
- Typhoon Oliwa, a western Pacific typhoon in 1997 with a similar sounding name, which originated from the central Pacific Ocean
