= 1960 Pacific typhoon season =

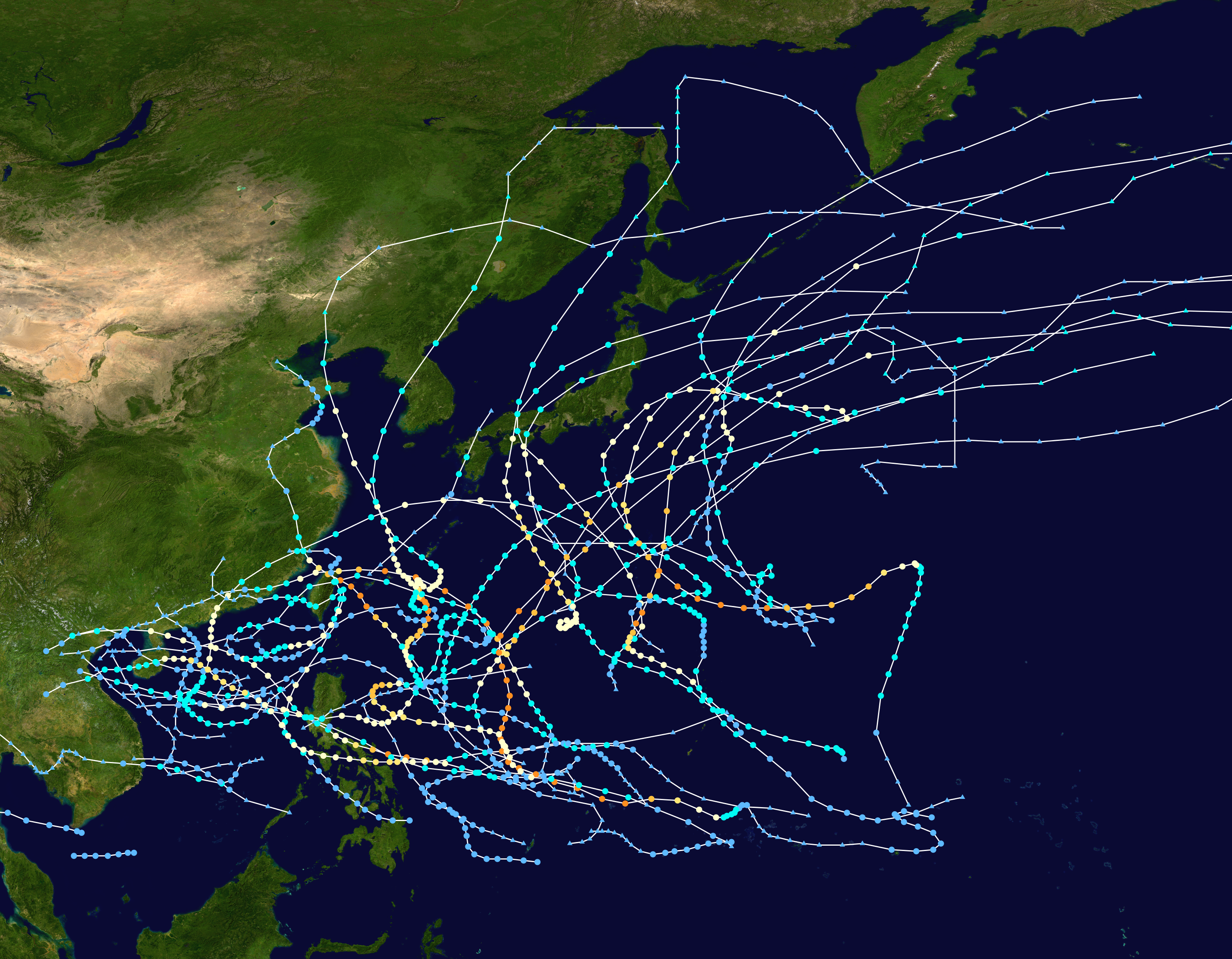
- Season summary map

Seasonal boundaries
- First system formed: January 30, 1960
- Last system dissipated: December 20, 1960

Strongest storm
- Name: Shirley
  - Maximum winds: 250 km/h (155 mph) (1-minute sustained)
  - Lowest pressure: 910 hPa (mbar)

Seasonal statistics
- Total depressions: 39
- Total storms: 30
- Typhoons: 19
- Very strong typhoons: 2 (unofficial)
- Total fatalities: >2,869
- Total damage: At least $69 million (1960 USD)

Related articles
- 1960 Atlantic hurricane season; 1960 Pacific hurricane season; 1960 North Indian Ocean cyclone season

The 1960 Pacific typhoon season had no official bounds; it ran year-round in 1960, but most tropical cyclones tend to form in the northwestern Pacific Ocean between June and December. These dates conventionally delimit the period of each year when most tropical cyclones form in the northwestern Pacific Ocean.

The scope of this article is limited to the Pacific Ocean, north of the equator, and west of the International Date Line. Storms that form east of the dateline and north of the equator are called hurricanes; see 1960 Pacific hurricane season. Tropical storms formed in the entire west Pacific basin were assigned a name by the Joint Typhoon Warning Center. Tropical depressions in this basin had the "W" suffix added to their number.

== Systems ==
=== Tropical Depression Ivy ===
- Tropical depression (JMA)
- Tropical depression (SSHWS)
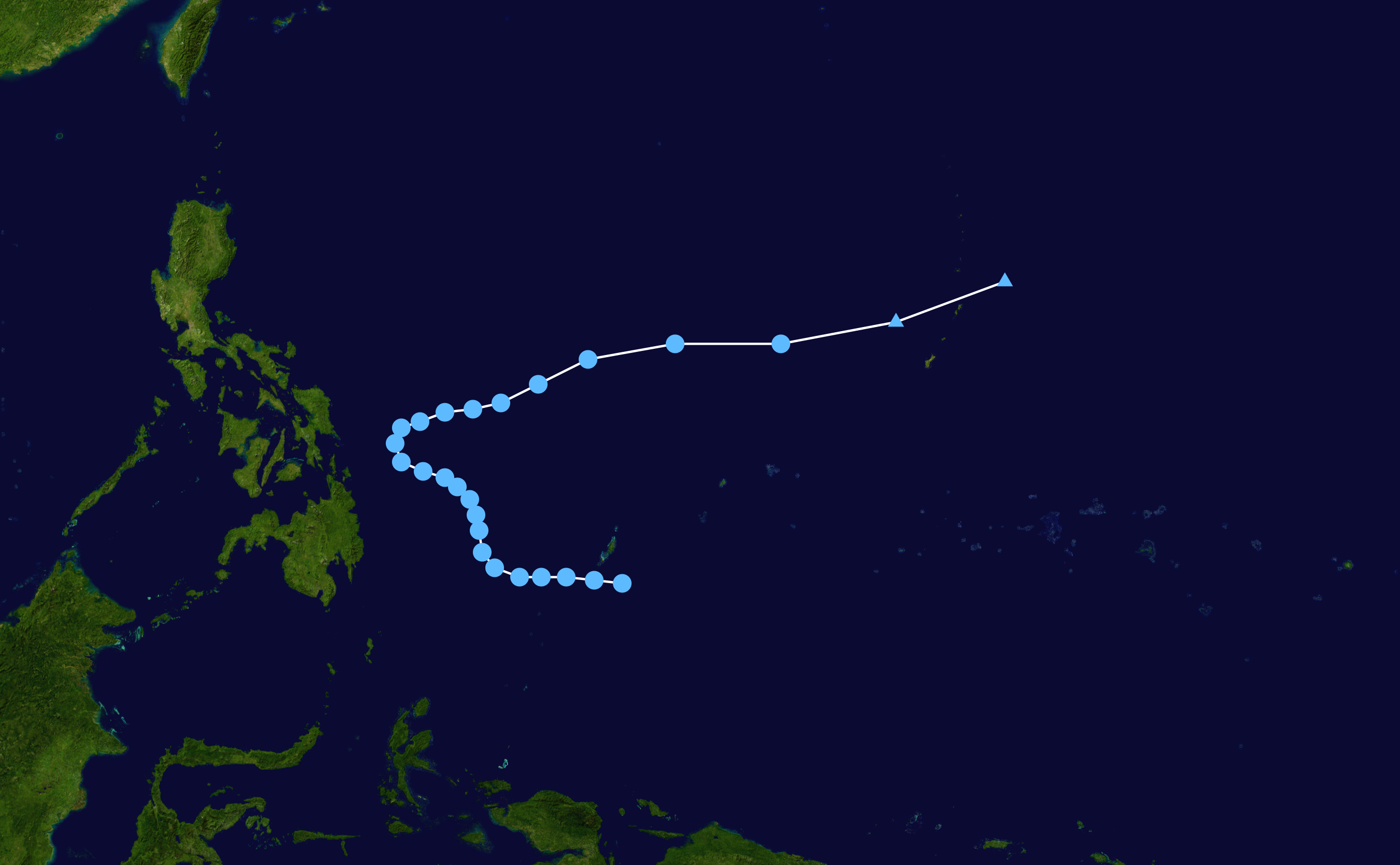
- Duration: January 30 – February 3
- Peak intensity: 55 km/h (35 mph) (1-min); 1000 hPa (mbar)

Ivy formed on January 30. Over the next few days, it moved towards the Philippines. It then turned east and dissipated on February 3.

=== Tropical Depression Jean ===
- Tropical depression (JMA)
- Tropical depression (SSHWS)
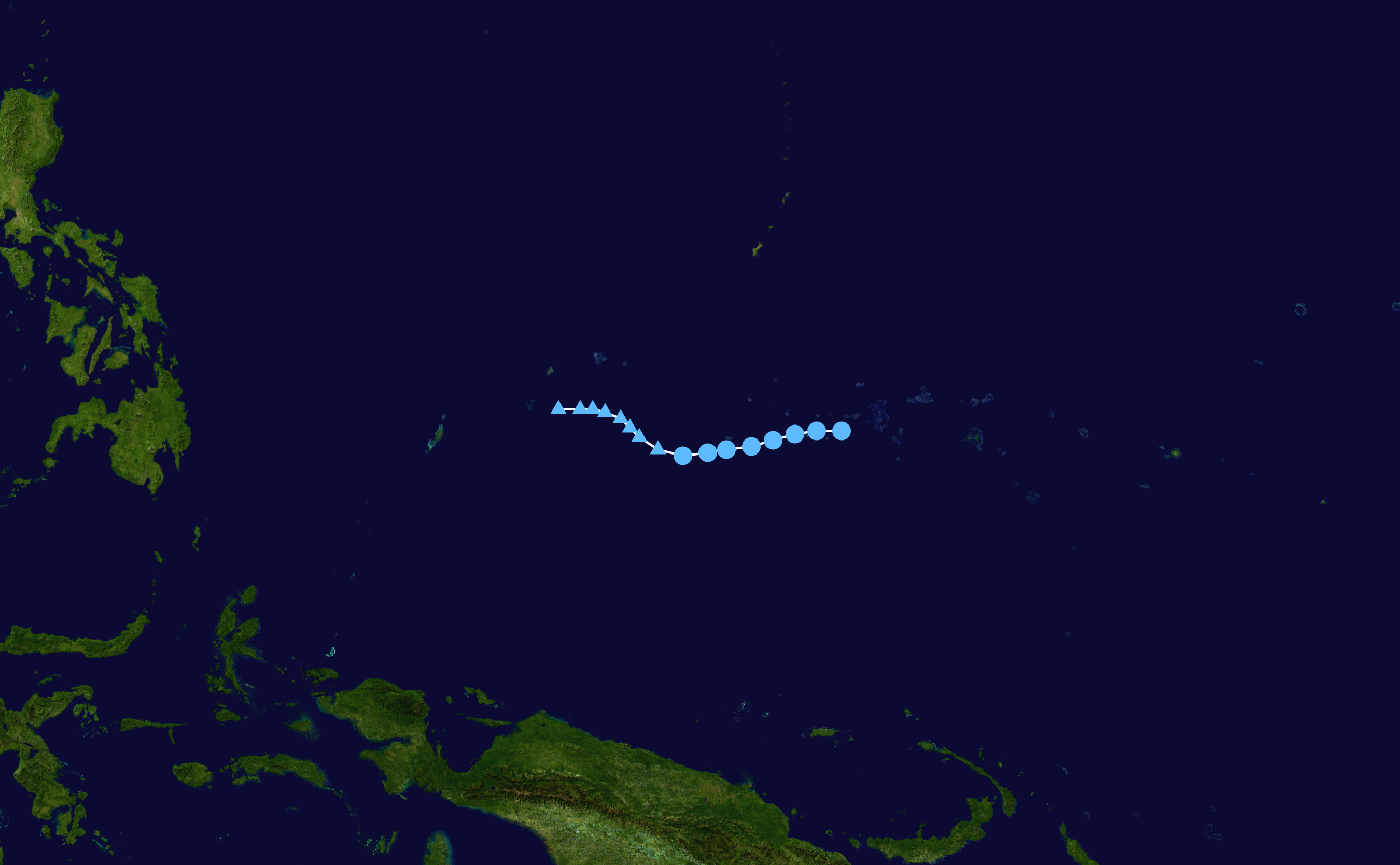
- Duration: March 7 – March 9
- Peak intensity: 45 km/h (30 mph) (1-min); 1004 hPa (mbar)

Jean was a short-lived tropical depression. It formed on March 7. The storm slowly moved west and dissipated on March 9.

=== Typhoon Karen ===
- Tropical storm (JMA)
- Category 1-equivalent typhoon (SSHWS)
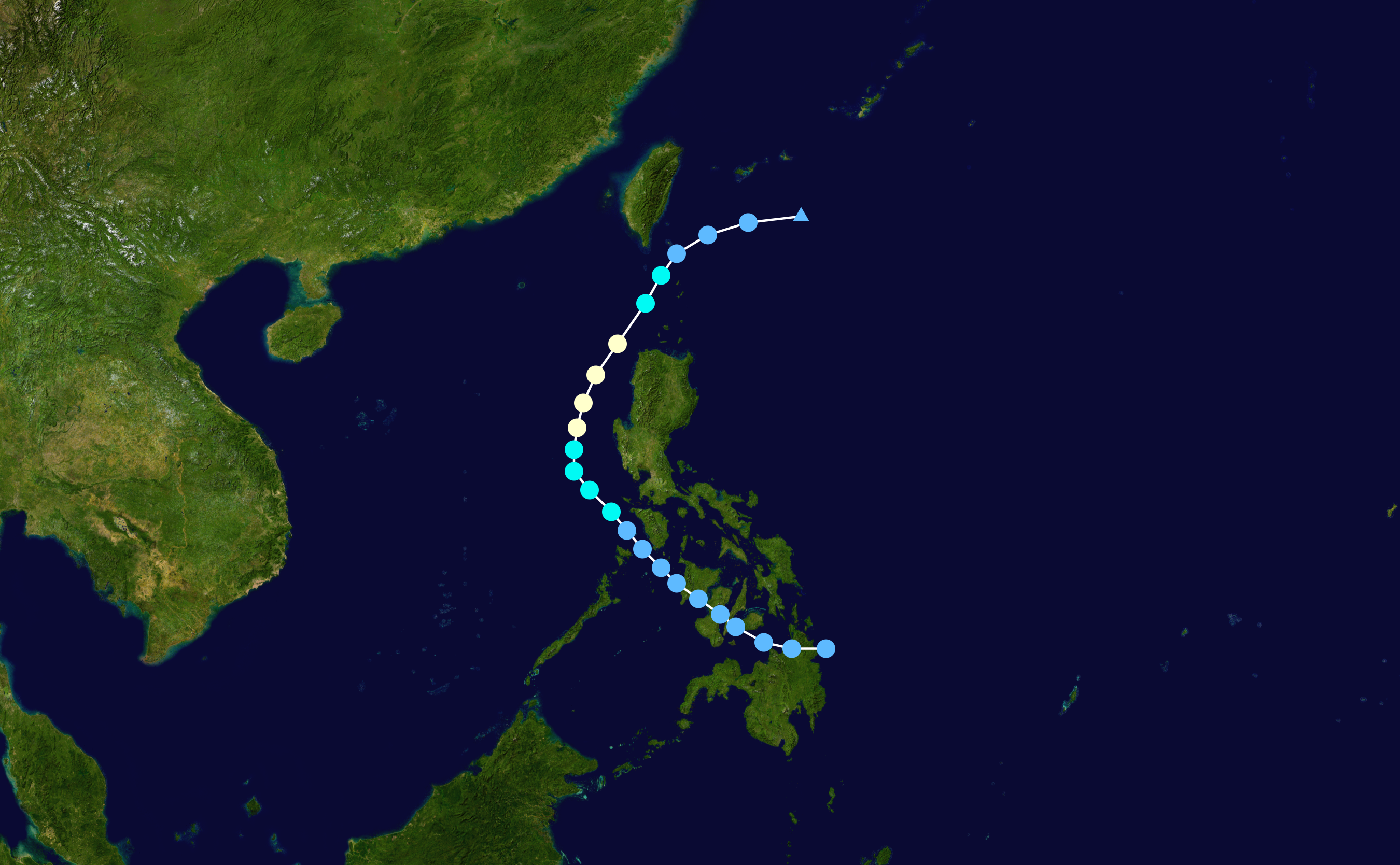
- Duration: April 21 – April 27
- Peak intensity: 140 km/h (85 mph) (1-min); 990 hPa (mbar)

An area of disturbed weather in the Philippine Sea moved westward and organized into a tropical depression on April 22. It moved northwestward through the Philippines, strengthening quickly to a typhoon on the 24th due to its small size. Karen turned to the northeast, and despite favorable conditions, rapidly weakened until dissipation on the 26th. Karen left 56 dead in the Philippines, left 7,000 homeless, and caused $2 million (1960 USD) in crop and property damage.

=== Tropical Storm Lucille ===
- Typhoon (JMA)
- Tropical storm (SSHWS)
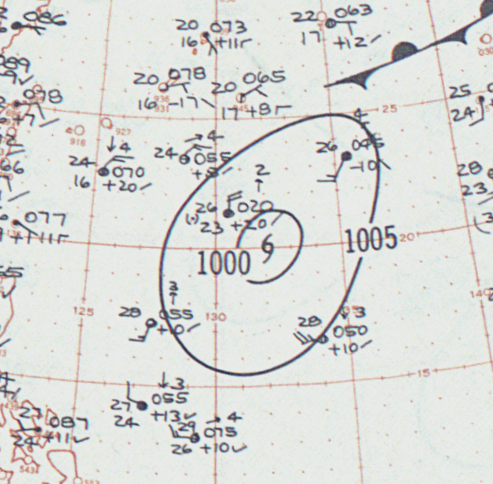
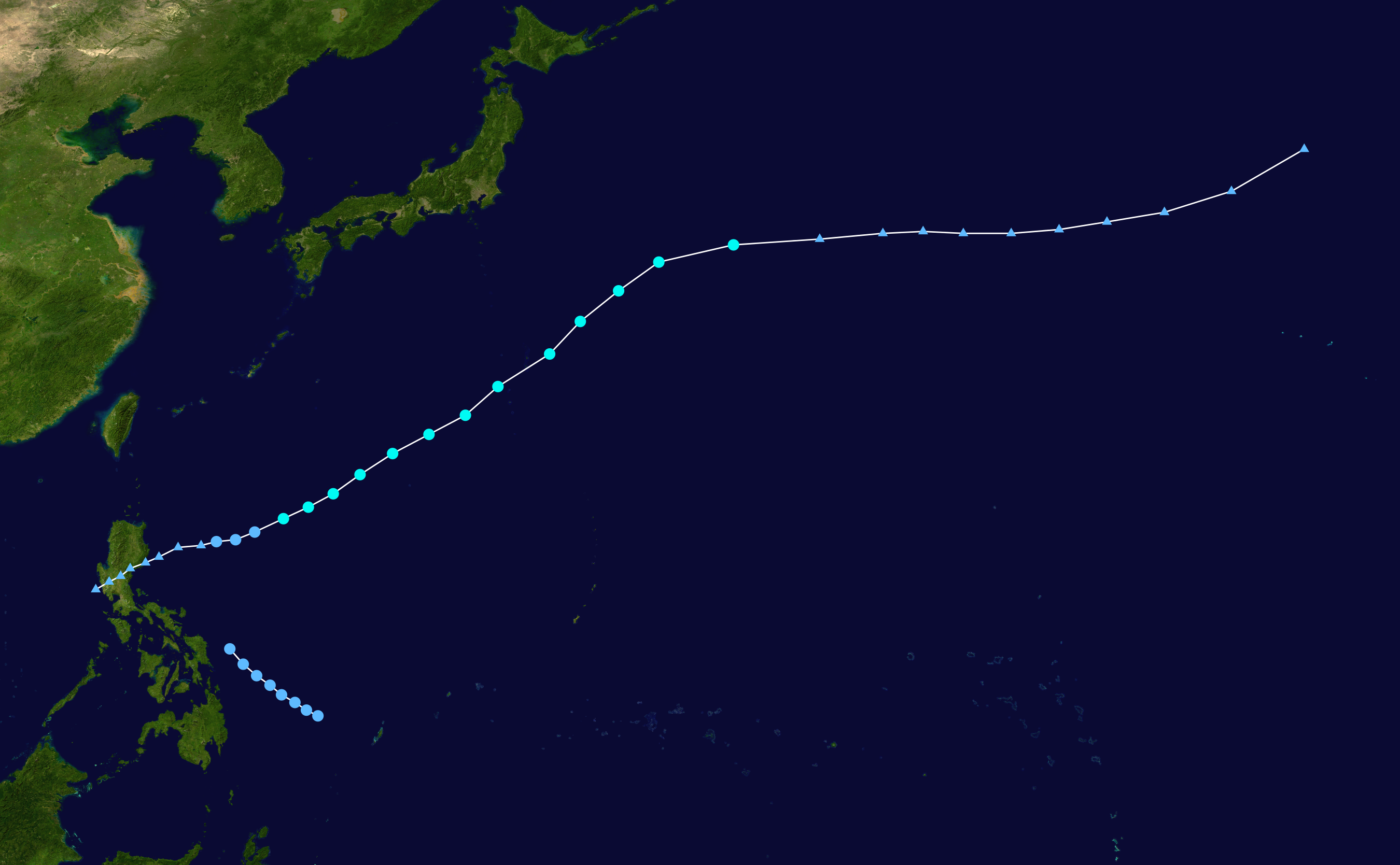
- Duration: May 27 – June 2
- Peak intensity: 85 km/h (50 mph) (1-min); 996 hPa (mbar)

Lucille was identified as a weak tropical depression on May 25 to the east of the Philippines. Tracking northwestward, the system failed to develop and warnings on it were discontinued on May 27. At the same time, a second system began organizing along the west coast of Luzon. The two systems ultimately merged into one over the Philippines between May 28 and 29. Now tracking northeastward, the system re-intensified and became a tropical storm on May 30. Lucille attained its peak intensity later that day with winds of 85 km/h (55 mph). As it accelerated over open waters, the system brushed the islands of Iwo Jima and Chichi-jima before transitioning into an extratropical cyclone on June 1. The remnants of Lucille were last noted on June 4 near the International Date Line.

Between May 27 and 29, heavy rains fell across much of Luzon as Lucille developed. These rains, amounting to 406 mm (16 in) in the suburbs of Manila, triggered destructive floods that left some areas under 4.6 m (15 ft) of water. The worst of the floods took place during the overnight hours of May 28 to 29. During that time, hundreds of homes were swept away and an estimated 300–500 people, including at least 80 children, were killed. Monetary losses from the floods exceeded $2 million.

=== Typhoon Mary ===
- Typhoon (JMA)
- Category 1-equivalent typhoon
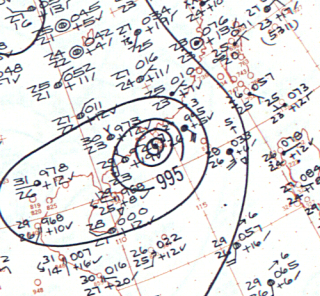
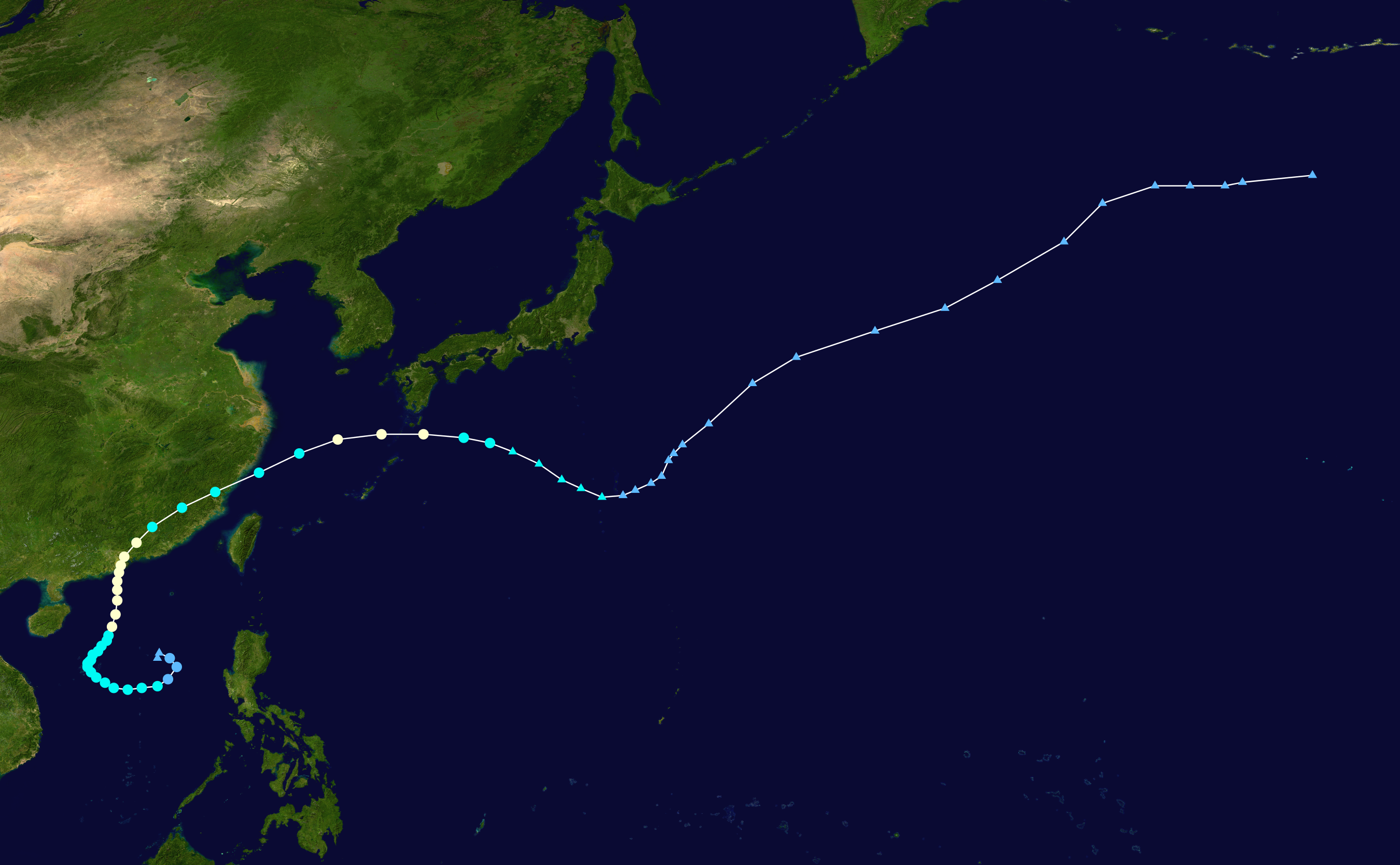
- Duration: June 2 – June 11
- Peak intensity: 150 km/h (90 mph) (1-min); 980 hPa (mbar)

A trough of low pressure spawned a tropical depression in the South China Sea on June 3 and moved slowly westward. Favorable conditions allowed it to quickly strengthen into Tropical Storm Mary, and after turning northward it attained typhoon status on the 7th. Mary continued to intensify to a 90 mph (140 km/h) typhoon just before making landfall 20 miles (32 km) west of Hong Kong on the 8th. After weakening while moving northeastward over China, the storm restrengthened over the Western Pacific to a typhoon on the 10th. It passed near Okinawa, weakened, and accelerated to the east until it became extratropical on the 13th.

Also known as Bloody Mary, the typhoon was the worst to hit Hong Kong in 23 years (since the worst typhoon on the record of Hong Kong hit on 2 September 1937). Its 14.12 inches (359 mm) of rain, mudslides, and strong winds caused extreme damage across Hong Kong and southern China, leaving over 100 dead and over 18,000 homeless. The only positive aspect of the storm was its rainfall, which helped end a severe drought in the colony. An additional 1,600 people were killed following more landslides triggered by the remnants of the storm.

In addition to its impact in Hong Kong, Mary brought heavy rains and flooding in Taiwan, especially in the capital city of Taipei. Moderate crop damage was seen to the rice crop. Four fishermen drowned off the island's southern coast, but there were no fatalities on the island. Despite its effects, the name Mary was not retired.

=== Tropical Storm Nadine ===
- Typhoon (JMA)
- Tropical storm (SSHWS)
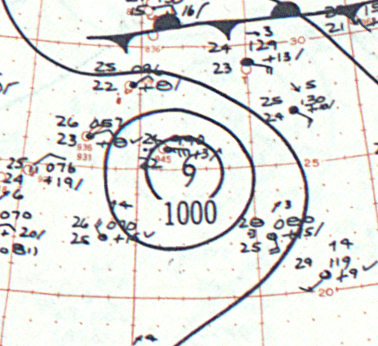
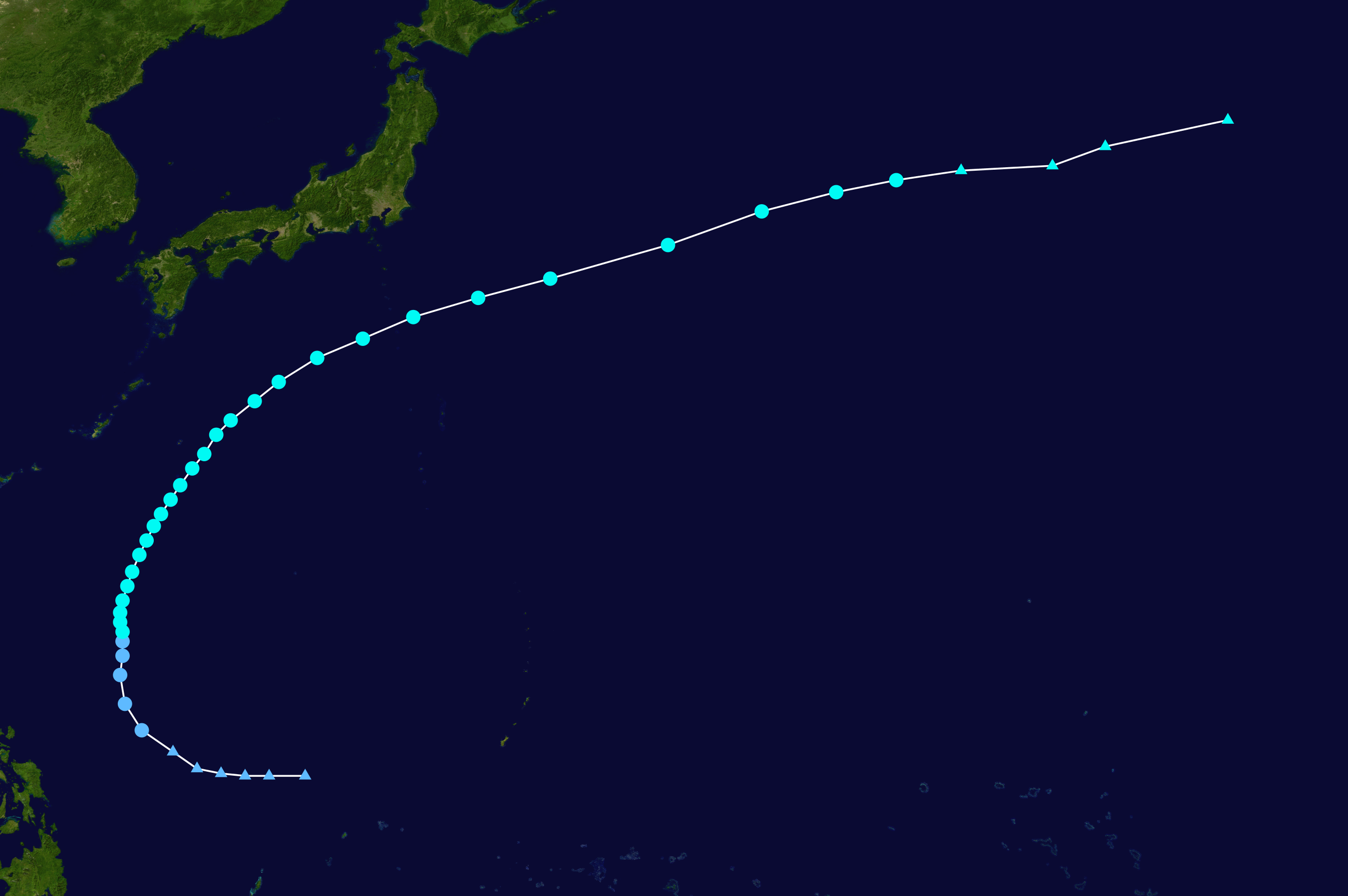
- Duration: June 3 – June 10
- Peak intensity: 140 km/h (85 mph) (1-min); 985 hPa (mbar)

On June 3, Nadine formed as Tropical Depression Five, which later became a tropical storm. On June 5, Nadine appeared to have been intensifying, likely at a pressure of 990 hPa (29 inHg), with a ship reporting winds of around 83 km/h (50 mph) the same day. A P2V reconnaissance aircraft on June 6 reported winds of 116 km/h (70 mph) and 140 km/h (87 mph), respectively. By June 9, the storm began to weaken, and by June 10, the final warning was issued, as it dissipated.

=== Typhoon Olive ===
- Typhoon (JMA)
- Category 4-equivalent typhoon (SSHWS)
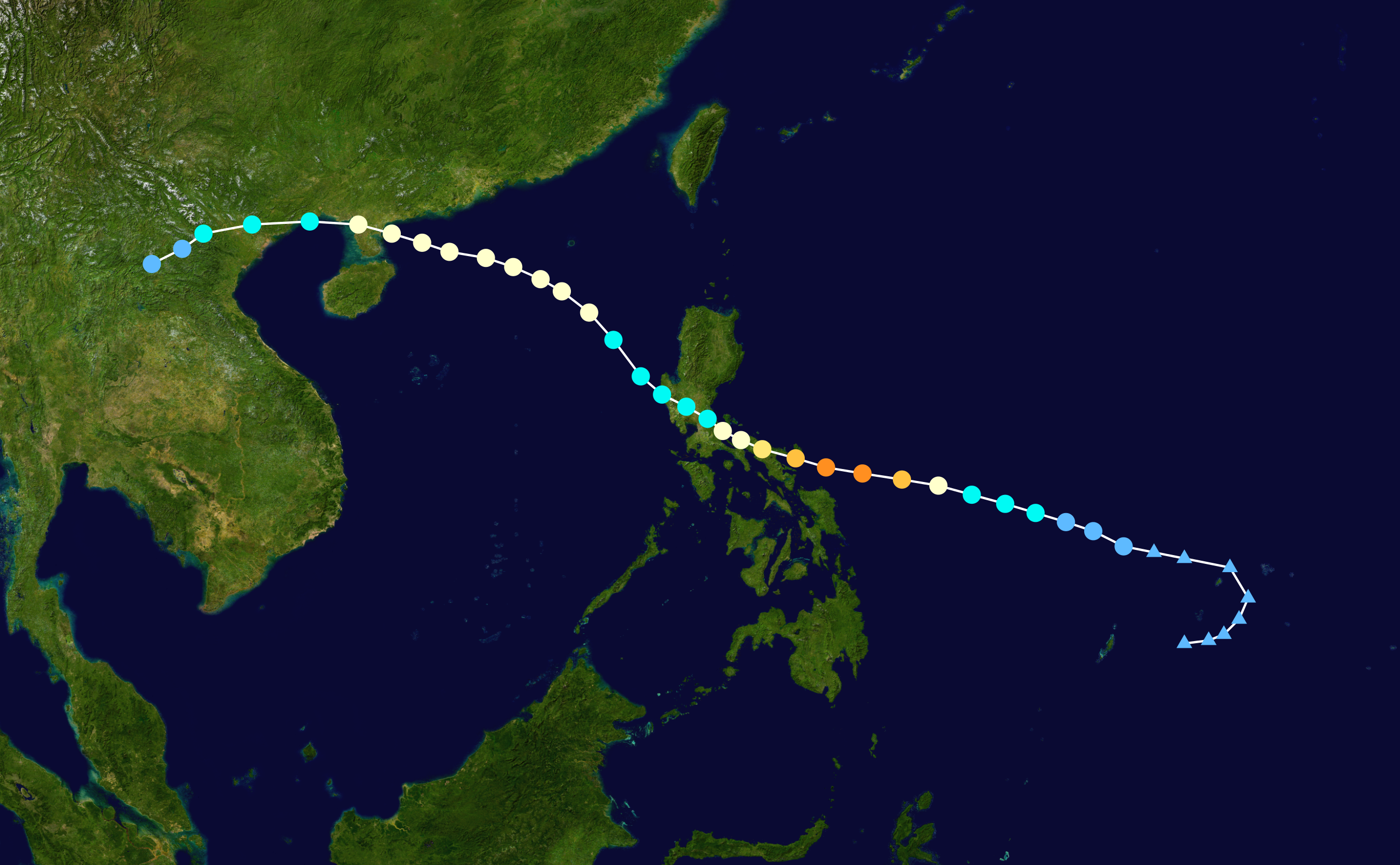
- Duration: June 21 – July 1
- Peak intensity: 230 km/h (145 mph) (1-min); 950 hPa (mbar)

On June 23, a tropical depression developed to the east of the Philippines. It entered nearly ideal conditions as it moved to the west-northwest, and, just 42 hours after forming, reached peak intensity of 145 mph (233 km/h). Due to lack of inflow from the archipelago to its west, Olive weakened to a 125 mph (201 km/h) typhoon at the time of its eastern Philippine landfall. It rapidly weakened while crossing to a tropical storm, but restrengthened into a typhoon in the South China Sea. It turned to the west, and struck southern China on June 29 as an 80 mph (130 km/h) typhoon. Olive rapidly weakened over land and the northern Gulf of Tonkin and dissipated on July 1.

A storm surge of 6–8 feet flooded much of Manila, causing extensive property and transportation damage. Rains, amounting up to 203.2 mm (8.00 in) triggered flooding and numerous landslides. About 80 percent of the crops in southeast Luzon were destroyed by the flooding, and 404 people were killed. At least 32,000 buildings were destroyed by the storm, resulting in $30 million in damages. In addition, nearly 60,000 people were left homeless in the period after the storm's passage. During rescue attempts, many coastal defense force ships were either sunk or ran aground due to 7.3 m (24 ft) swell produced by Olive.

China and Hong Kong received heavy rainfall from Olive, causing moderate crop damage, though there were no reported casualties there.

=== Typhoon Polly ===
- Typhoon (JMA)
- Category 4-equivalent typhoon (SSHWS)
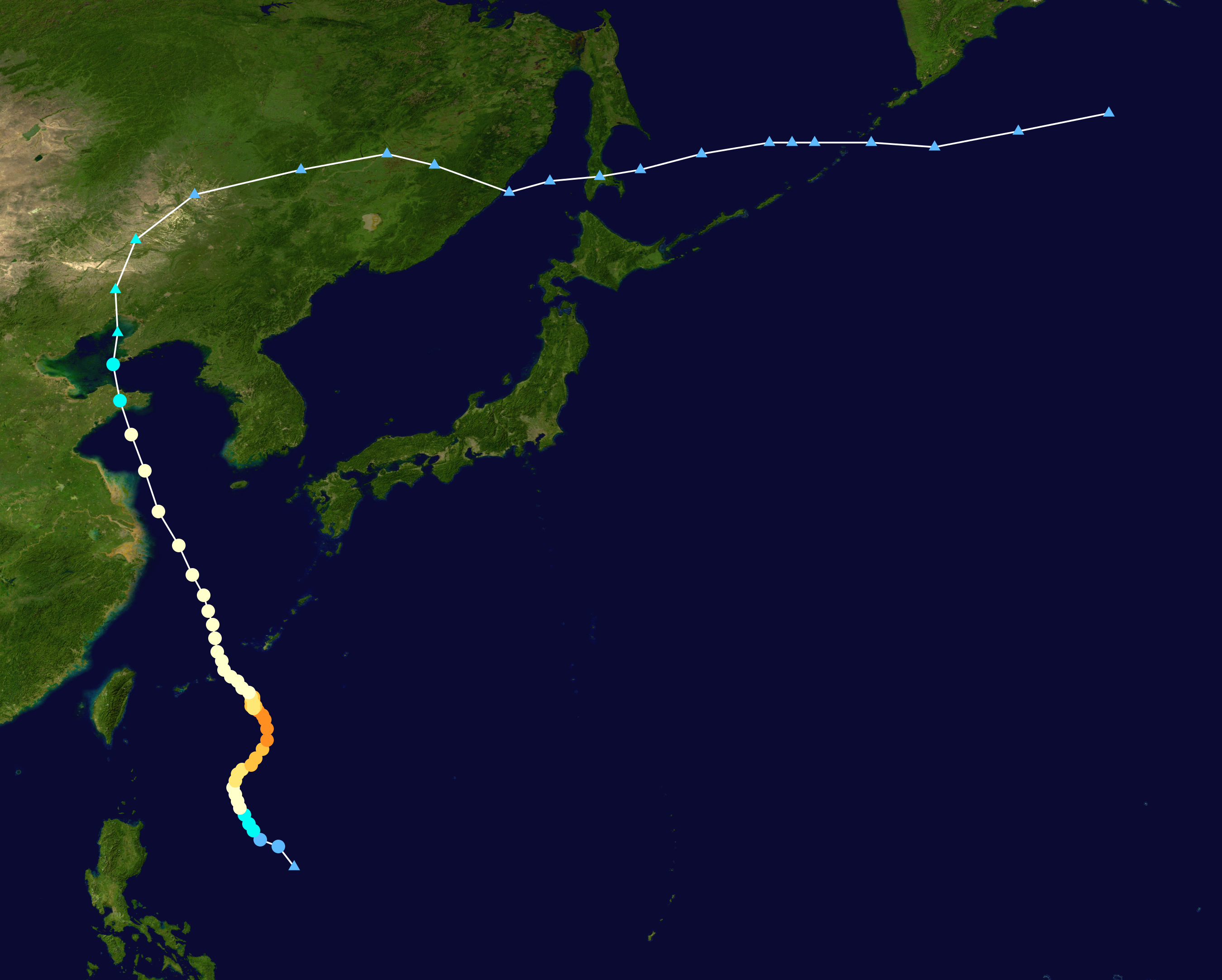
- Duration: July 17 – July 28
- Peak intensity: 215 km/h (130 mph) (1-min); 950 hPa (mbar)

Typhoon Polly formed east of the Philippines on July 17. It slowly moved north-northeast and intensified to a Category 4 super typhoon with windspeed of 215 km/h (130 mph). It then moved north and sped up. It hit China before turning into an extratropical cyclone and dissipated on July 28.

=== Tropical Storm Rose ===
- Tropical storm (JMA)
- Tropical storm (SSHWS)
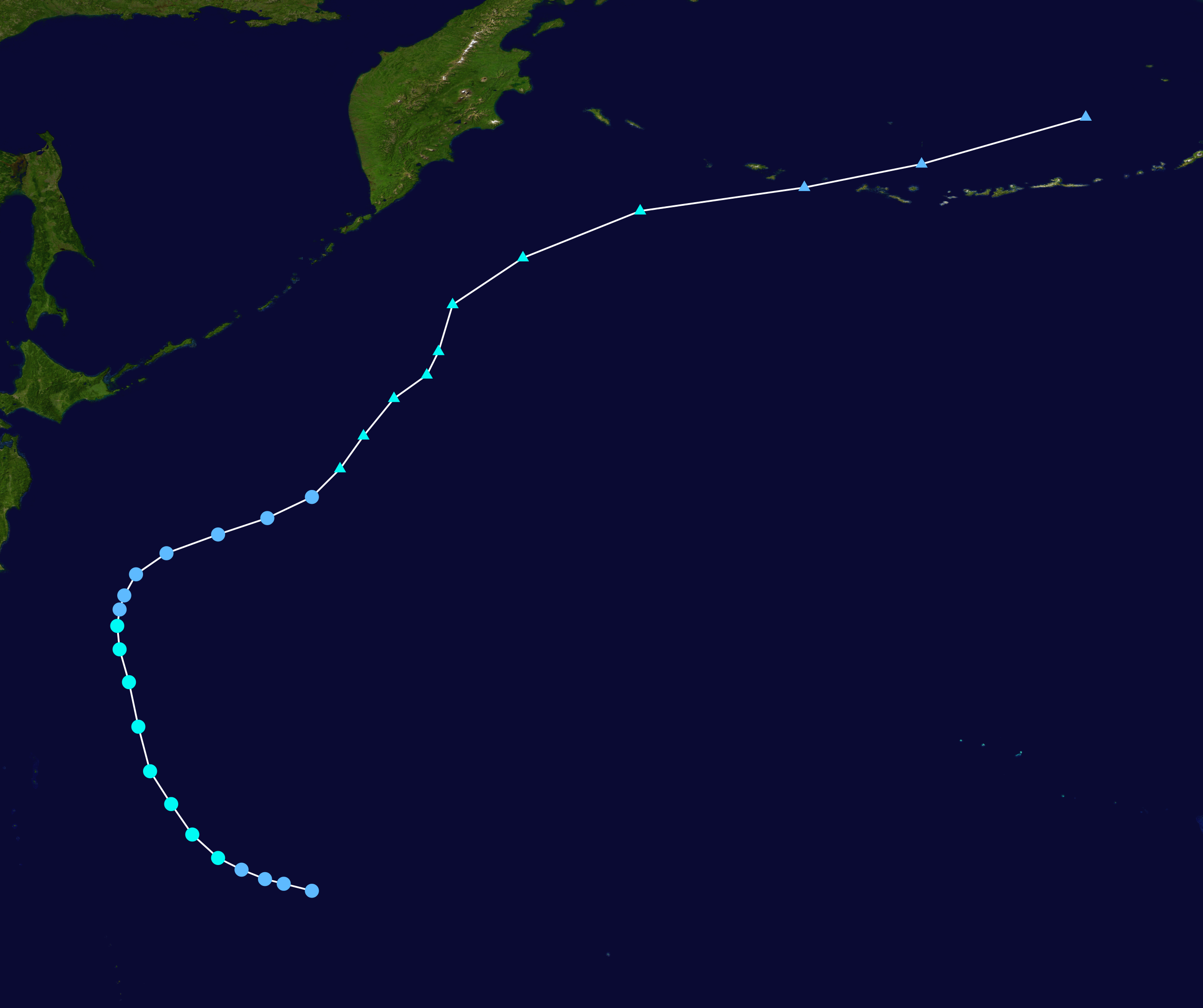
- Duration: July 24 – July 29
- Peak intensity: 75 km/h (45 mph) (1-min); 1000 hPa (mbar)

Rose was a short-lived storm that appeared on July 24. It quickly strengthened to a tropical storm. The storm was close to Japan, but didn't make landfall. The storm moved northeast and dissipated on July 21.

=== Typhoon Shirley ===
- Typhoon (JMA)
- Category 4-equivalent typhoon (SSHWS)
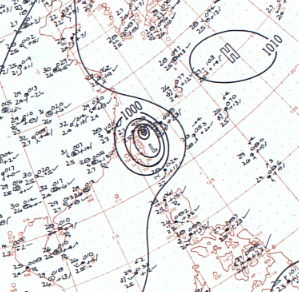
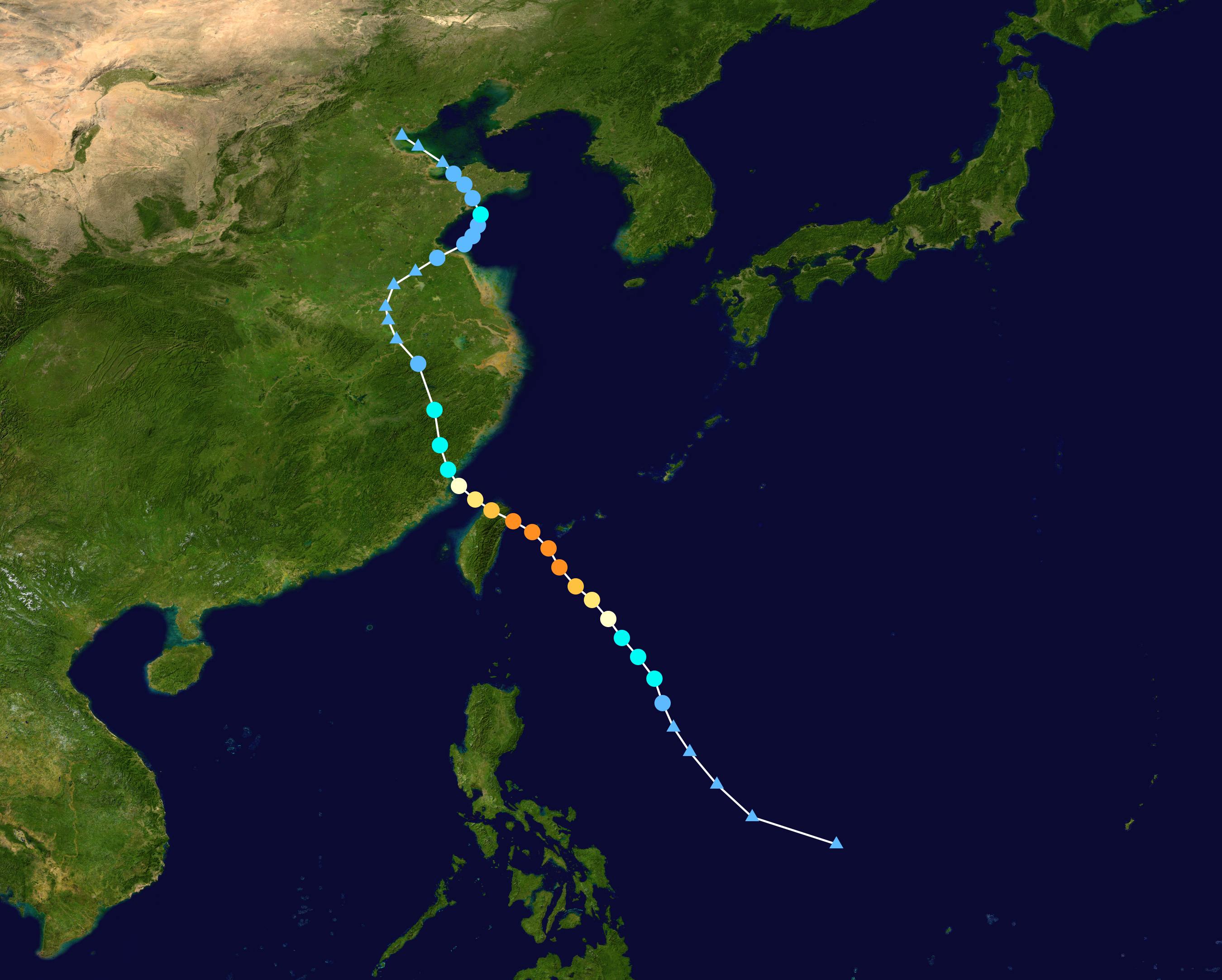
- Duration: July 27 – August 6
- Peak intensity: 250 km/h (155 mph) (1-min); 910 hPa (mbar)

On July 29, a tropical depression formed to the east of northern Luzon. Moving to the northwest, it encountered favorable conditions for development, and rapidly intensified to a 155 mph (249 km/h) super typhoon just 48 hours after forming, with an eyewall only 7 miles (11 km) wide. Shirley continued to the northwest, and struck northeastern Taiwan as a slightly weaker 140 mph (230 km/h) typhoon on the July 31. The mountainous terrain ripped apart the typhoon's circulation, and after crossing the Taiwan Strait, it made landfall on southeastern China as a tropical storm. Shirley turned northward while moving inland, and dissipated on August 2. An unusual feature of the storm was the development of a secondary center while approaching Taiwan.

Shirley's 140 mph (230 km/h) winds and torrential rains devastated Taiwan, overflowing many rivers and trapping thousands. Nearly a foot of rain was reported on the island, causing extensive road and property damage. Little crop damage occurred due to Typhoon Mary destroying much of it months before. In all, Typhoon Shirley caused 104 fatalities, destroyed or damaged 9,890 houses, and left 50,194 people homeless.

=== Typhoon Trix ===
- Typhoon (JMA)
- Category 4-equivalent typhoon (SSHWS)
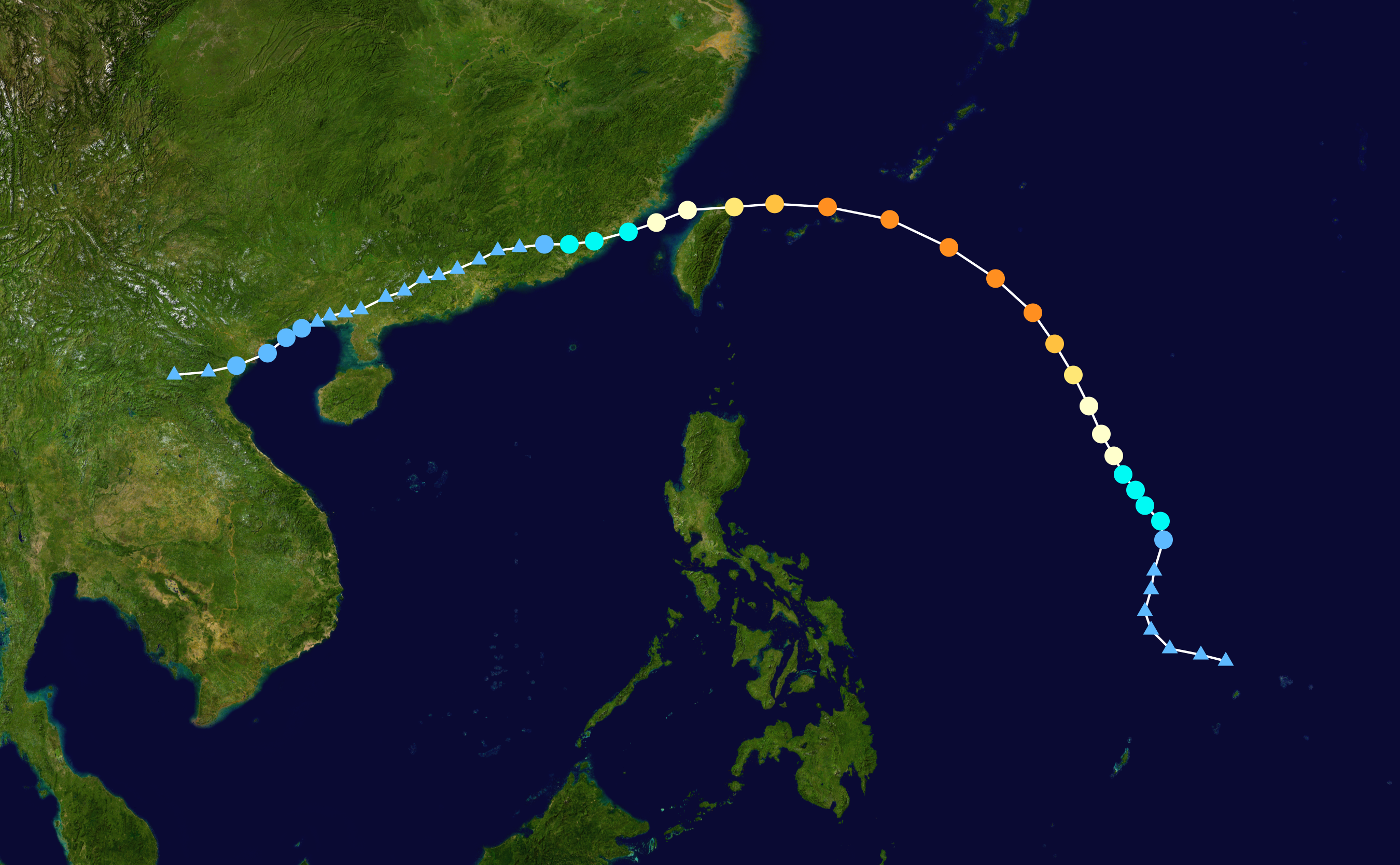
- Duration: August 2 – August 13
- Peak intensity: 230 km/h (145 mph) (1-min); 930 hPa (mbar)

Just one week after Shirley hit Taiwan, Typhoon Trix, which weakened from a peak of 145 mph (233 km/h), hit the northeastern part of the island with winds of 100 mph (160 km/h). Trix left four more dead and brought more severe flooding to the typhoon-ravaged country.

=== JMA Tropical Storm Ten ===
- Tropical storm (JMA)
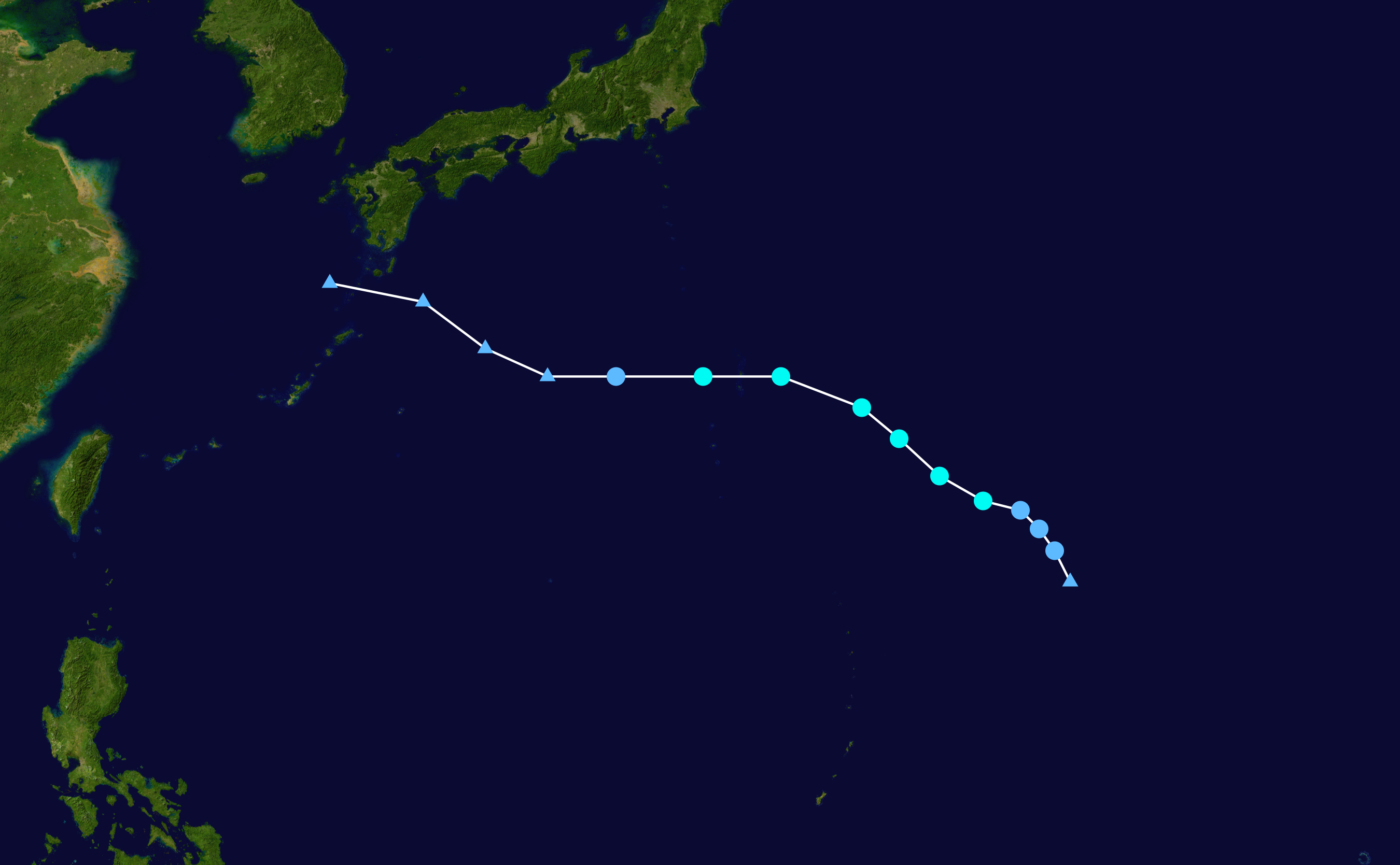
- Duration: August 6 – August 9
- Peak intensity: 85 km/h (50 mph) (10-min); 1000 hPa (mbar)

A tropical depression formed on August 6 and was noted by JMA. Over the next few days, it moved north-northwest and strengthened into a tropical storm. It soon weakened and dissipated on August 9.

=== Typhoon Virginia ===
- Typhoon (JMA)
- Category 2-equivalent typhoon (SSHWS)
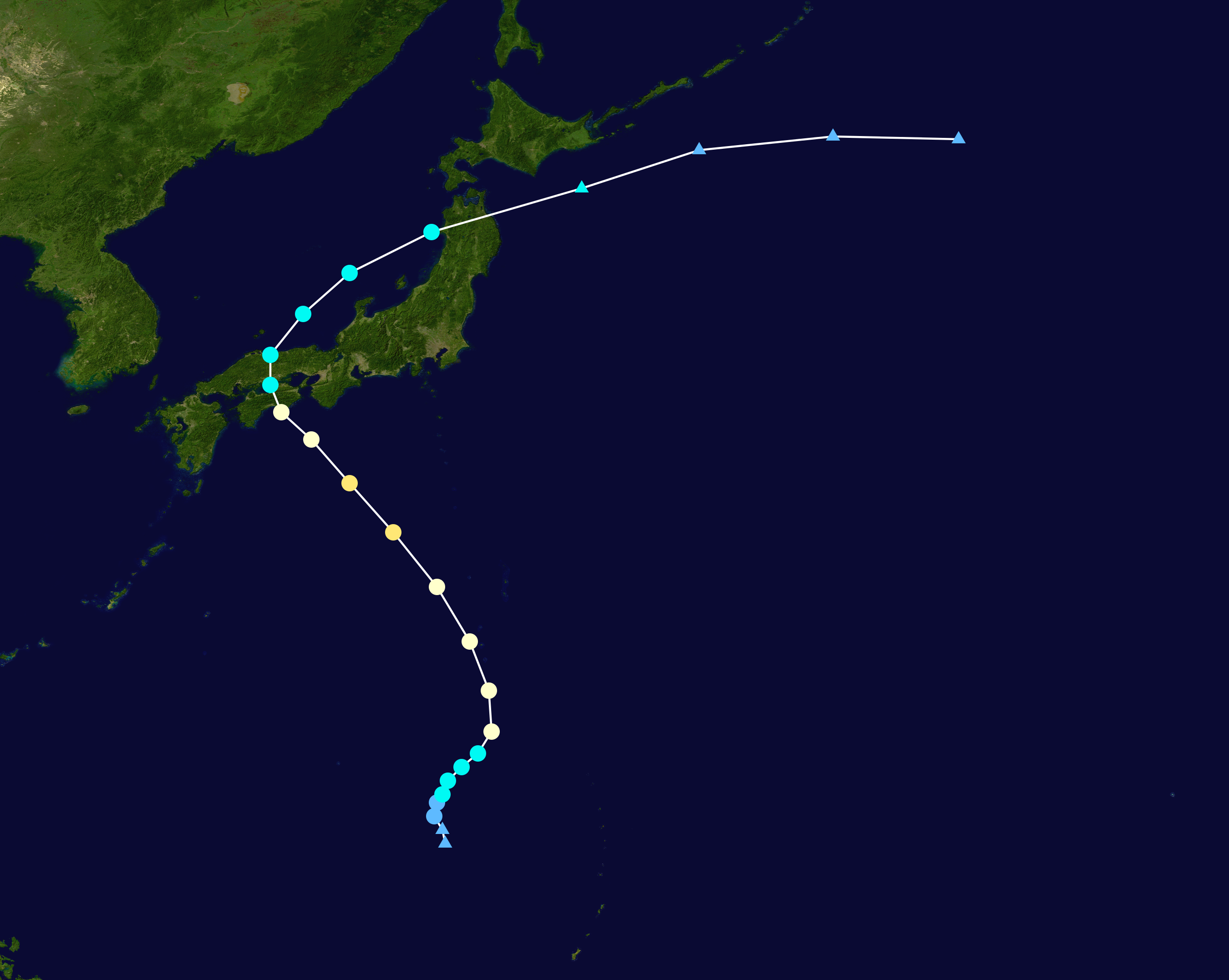
- Duration: August 7 – August 12
- Peak intensity: 155 km/h (100 mph) (1-min); 980 hPa (mbar)

Typhoon Virginia northwest of Guam on August 7. It moved northeast, and then turned northwest, strengthening to peak intensity of 155km/h (100mph). The storm struck Shikoku and Honshū island in Japan with winds of 90 mph (140 km/h). 4 inches of rain fell over most of southern Japan. 2 people were killed and one was injured.

=== Typhoon Wendy ===
- Typhoon (JMA)
- Category 1-equivalent typhoon (SSHWS)
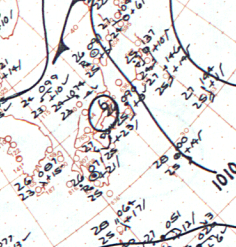
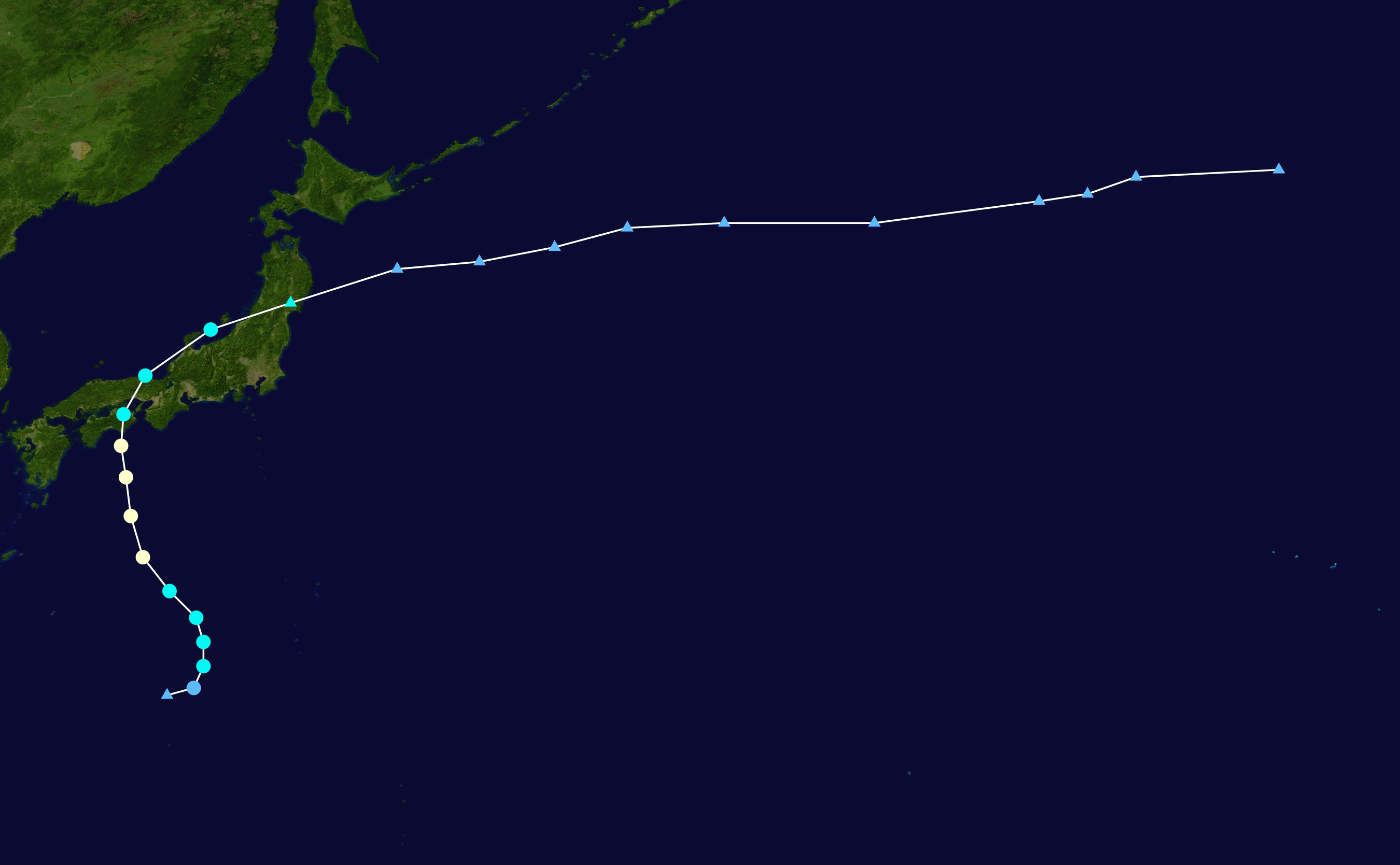
- Duration: August 10 – August 13
- Peak intensity: 140 km/h (85 mph) (1-min); 990 hPa (mbar)

On August 10, a trough extending from Typhoon Virginia developed abnormal wind directions, prompting the JTWC and JMA to designate it a tropical depression. It quickly strengthened into Tropical Storm Wendy west of Iwo Jima. Wendy intensified, becoming a typhoon south of Shikoku and peaking offshore. It made landfall on Shikoku, then southern Honshu, weakening over land. After briefly reemerging over the Sea of Japan, it made a final landfall on northern Honshu before the JTWC discontinued advisories and the JMA declared it extratropical.

Its development within Virginia's circulation was considered unusual. Wendy caused significant damage in Japan's Kinki and Chūbu regions from August 12-13, dropping heavy rain causing floods, landslides, bridge destruction, and inundating thousands of homes. The storm resulted in 28 deaths, 19 missing, and 154 injuries.

=== Tropical Storm Agnes ===
- Tropical storm (JMA)
- Tropical storm (SSHWS)
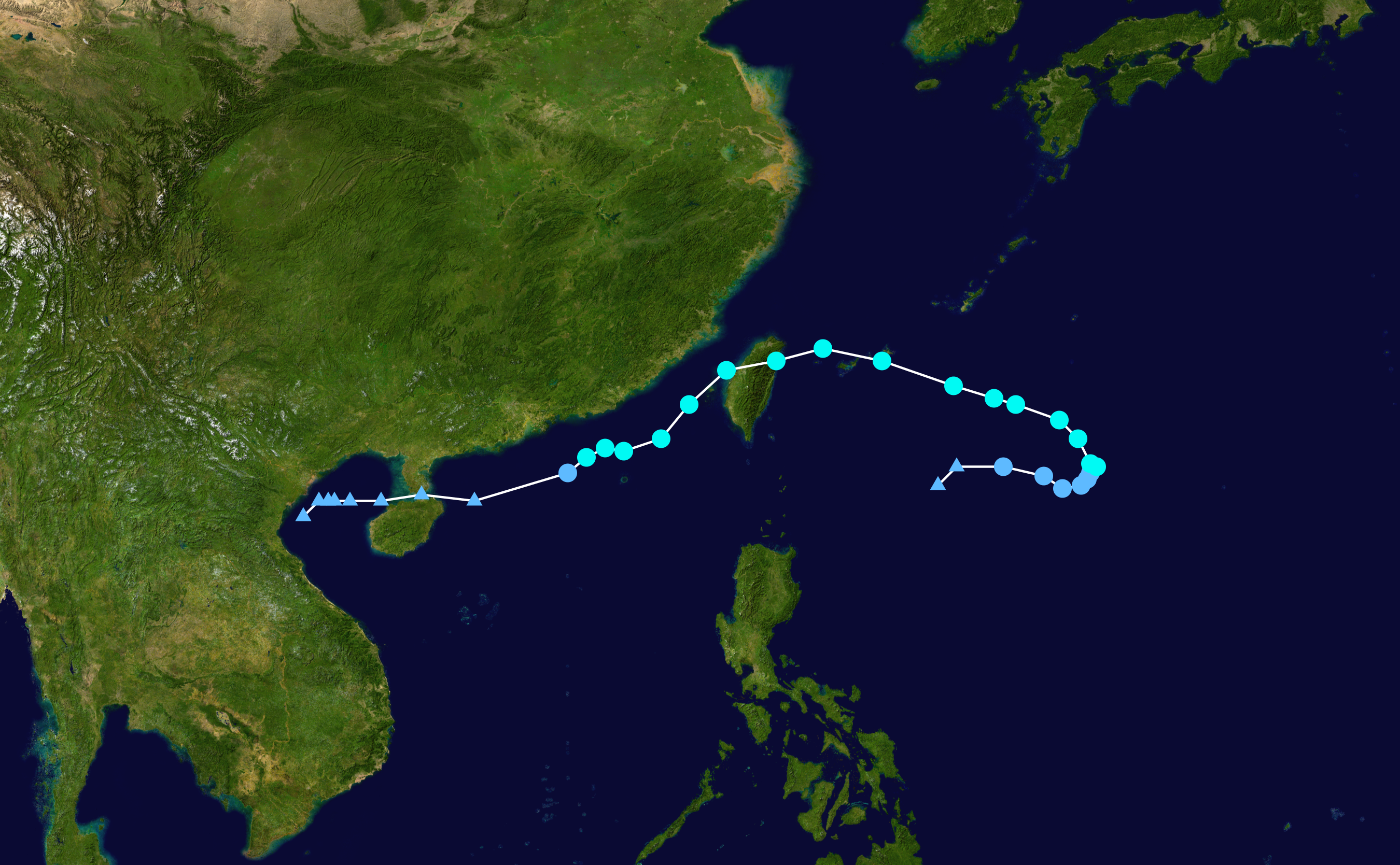
- Duration: August 10 – August 18
- Peak intensity: 95 km/h (60 mph) (1-min); 994 hPa (mbar)

Agnes formed northeast of Luzon on August 10. It turned northwest and developed into a tropical storm. The storm made landfall in Taiwan. It entered the South China Sea and weakened into a tropical depression. The storm dissipated on August 18.

=== Typhoon Bess ===
- Typhoon (JMA)
- Category 1-equivalent typhoon (SSHWS)
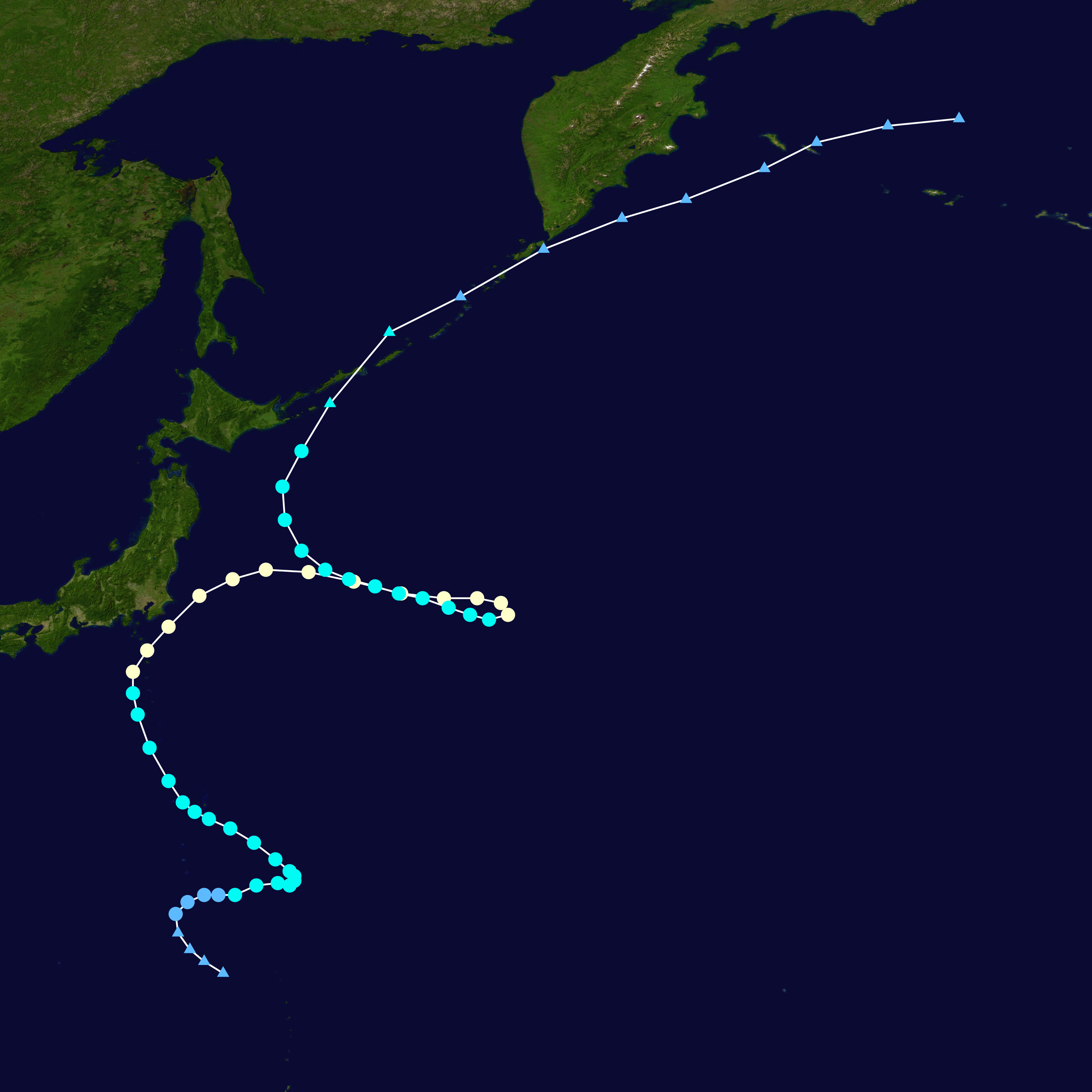
- Duration: August 15 – August 26
- Peak intensity: 120 km/h (75 mph) (1-min); 980 hPa (mbar)

Bess was a category 1 typhoon with a weird track. It affected the coast of Tokyo. Bess later became an extrotropical storm and dissipated in the Bering strait on August 26.

=== Typhoon Carmen ===
- Typhoon (JMA)
- Category 1-equivalent typhoon (SSHWS)
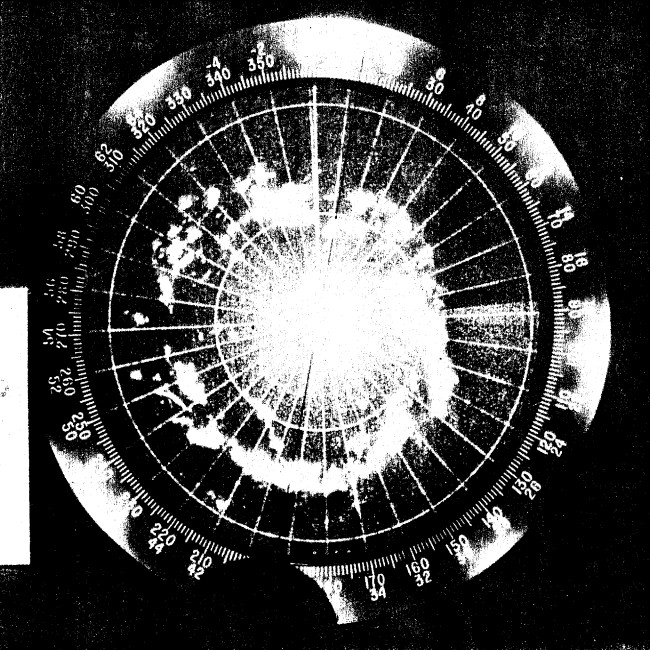
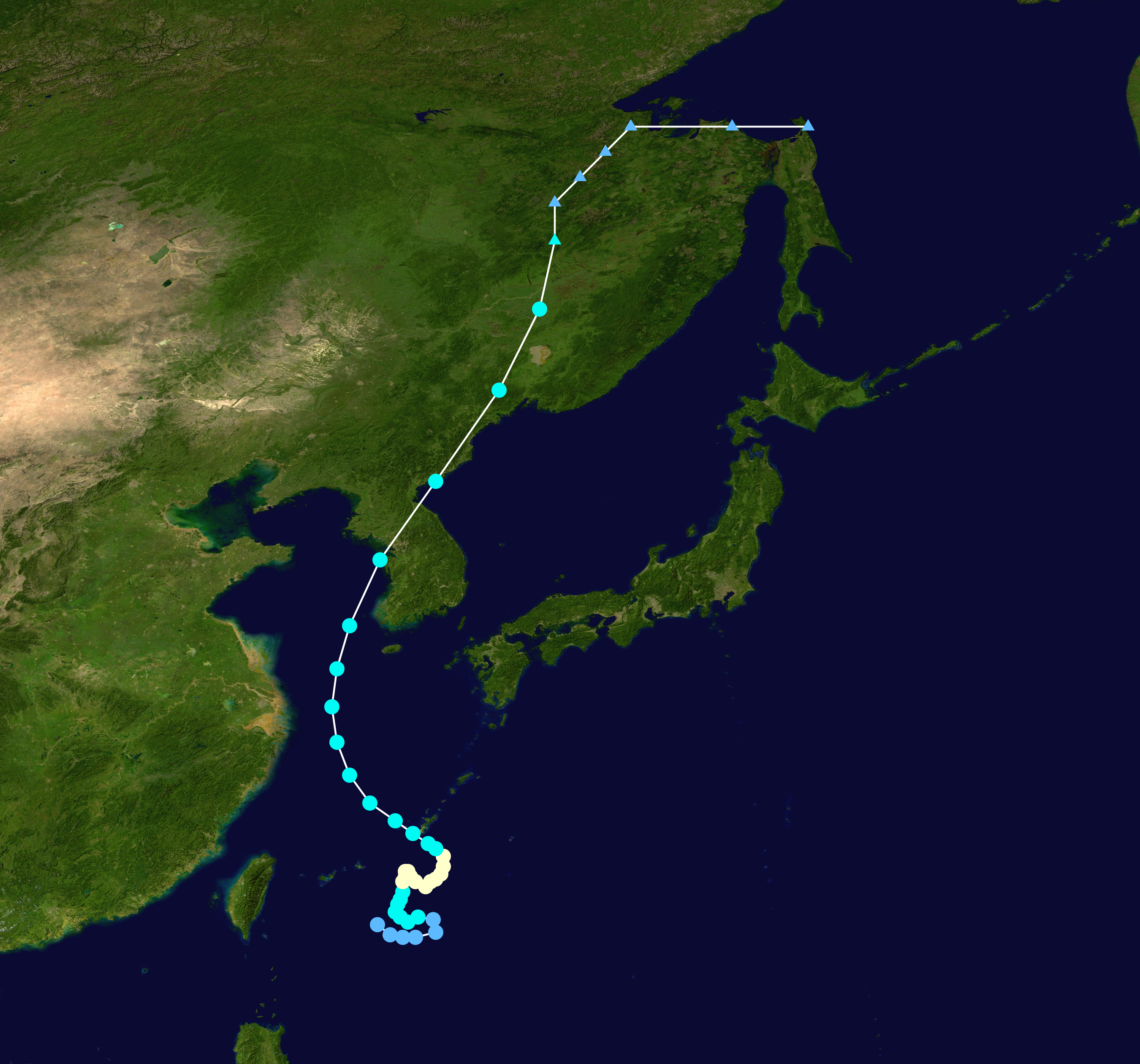
- Duration: August 15 – August 23
- Peak intensity: 140 km/h (85 mph) (1-min); 975 hPa (mbar)

A sharp trough of low pressure organized into a tropical depression on August 16. It moved northward, quickly strengthening to an 85 mph (137 km/h) typhoon. Carmen lost intensity as it continued to the north, and made landfall on South Korea as a 50 mph (80 km/h) tropical storm on the 23rd. The storm brought 50-foot (15 m) waves to the Korean peninsula, flooding coastal cities and sinking ships offshore. In all, Carmen caused 24 casualties and $2 million in damage (1960 USD).

Carmen is known for having the largest eye of any tropical cyclone in recorded history, tied with Typhoon Winnie in 1997. Radar data from Okinawa, Japan indicated that it was more than 200 miles (320 km) across.

=== Typhoon Della ===
- Typhoon (JMA)
- Category 2-equivalent typhoon (SSHWS)
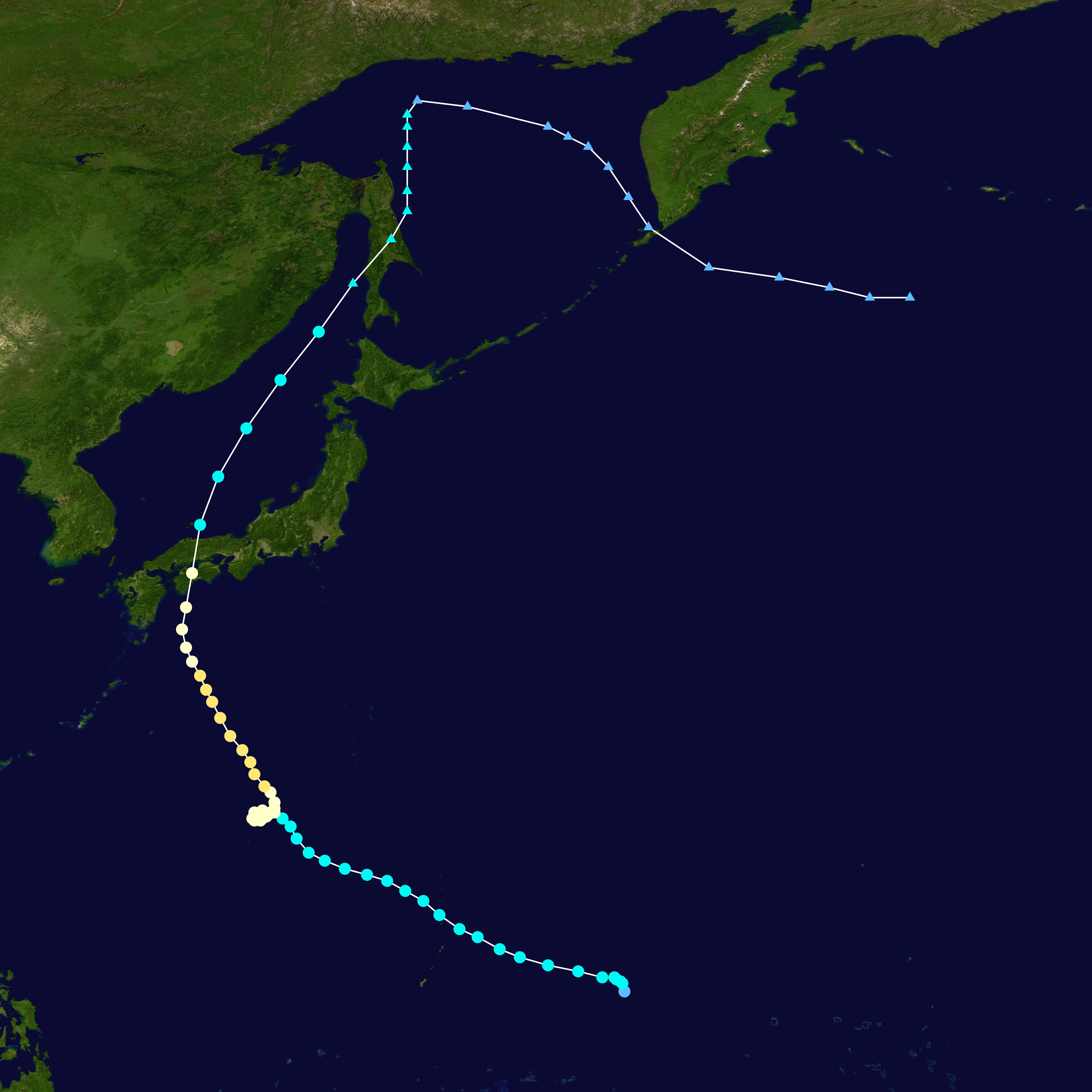
- Duration: August 17 – August 30
- Peak intensity: 175 km/h (110 mph) (1-min); 970 hPa (mbar)

The monsoon trough spawned a tropical storm in the open Western Pacific on August 20. Della moved to the northwest, strengthening to a typhoon on the 22nd before looping to the north-northwest. After peaking at 110 mph (180 km/h), Della weakened and hit southern Japan as a minimal typhoon. It accelerated to the northeast and became extratropical on the 31st. A landslide on Nishinomiya killed 38 road workers, while another 17 people were killed throughout the country from heavy flooding. Damages from the storm were estimated at $19 million.

=== Typhoon Elaine ===
- Typhoon (JMA)
- Category 1-equivalent typhoon (SSHWS)
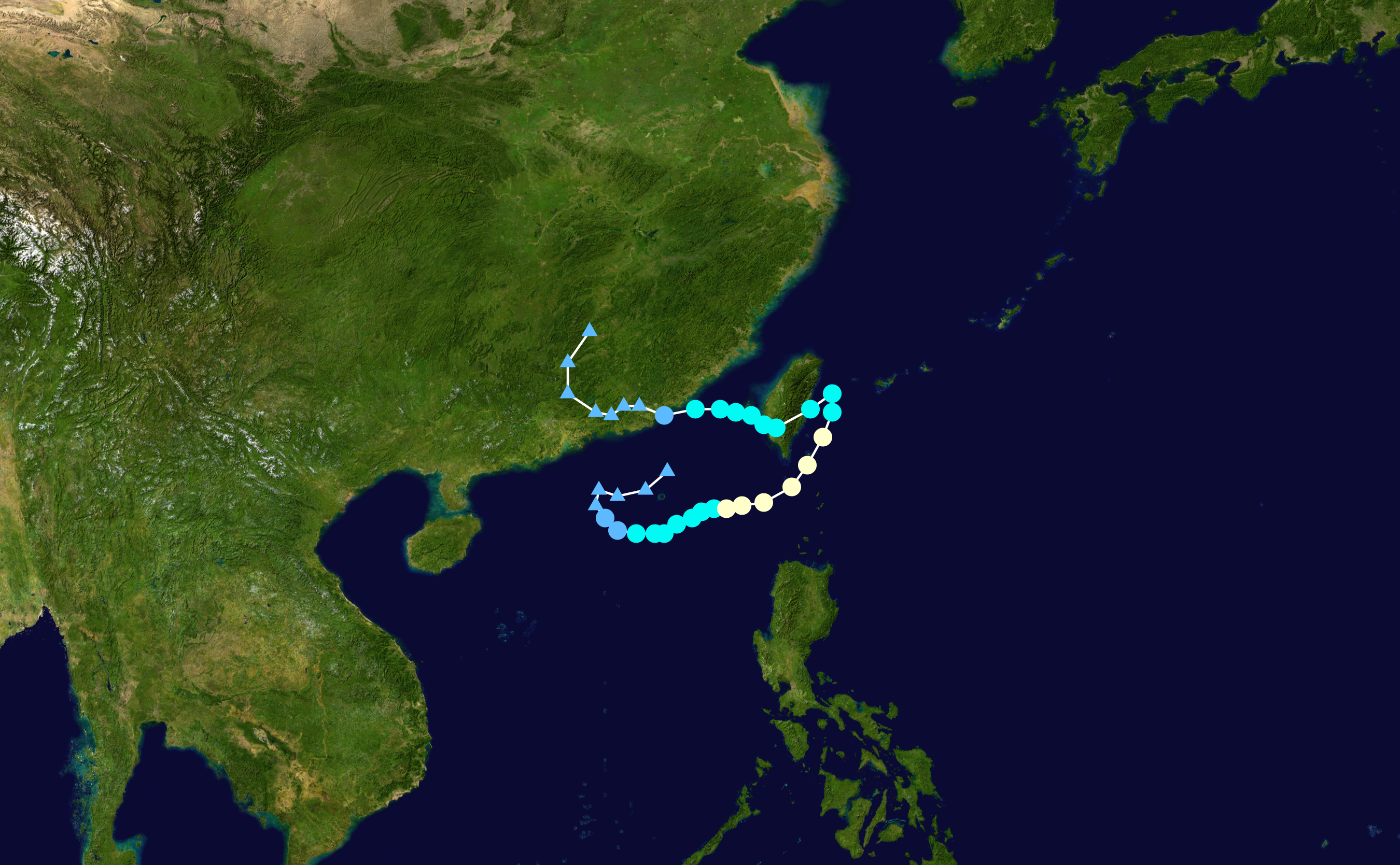
- Duration: August 18 – August 25
- Peak intensity: 140 km/h (85 mph) (1-min); 975 hPa (mbar)

Elaine made an erratic track toward Taiwan, with a second landfall in Mainland China.

=== Typhoon Faye ===
- Typhoon (JMA)
- Category 4-equivalent typhoon (SSHWS)
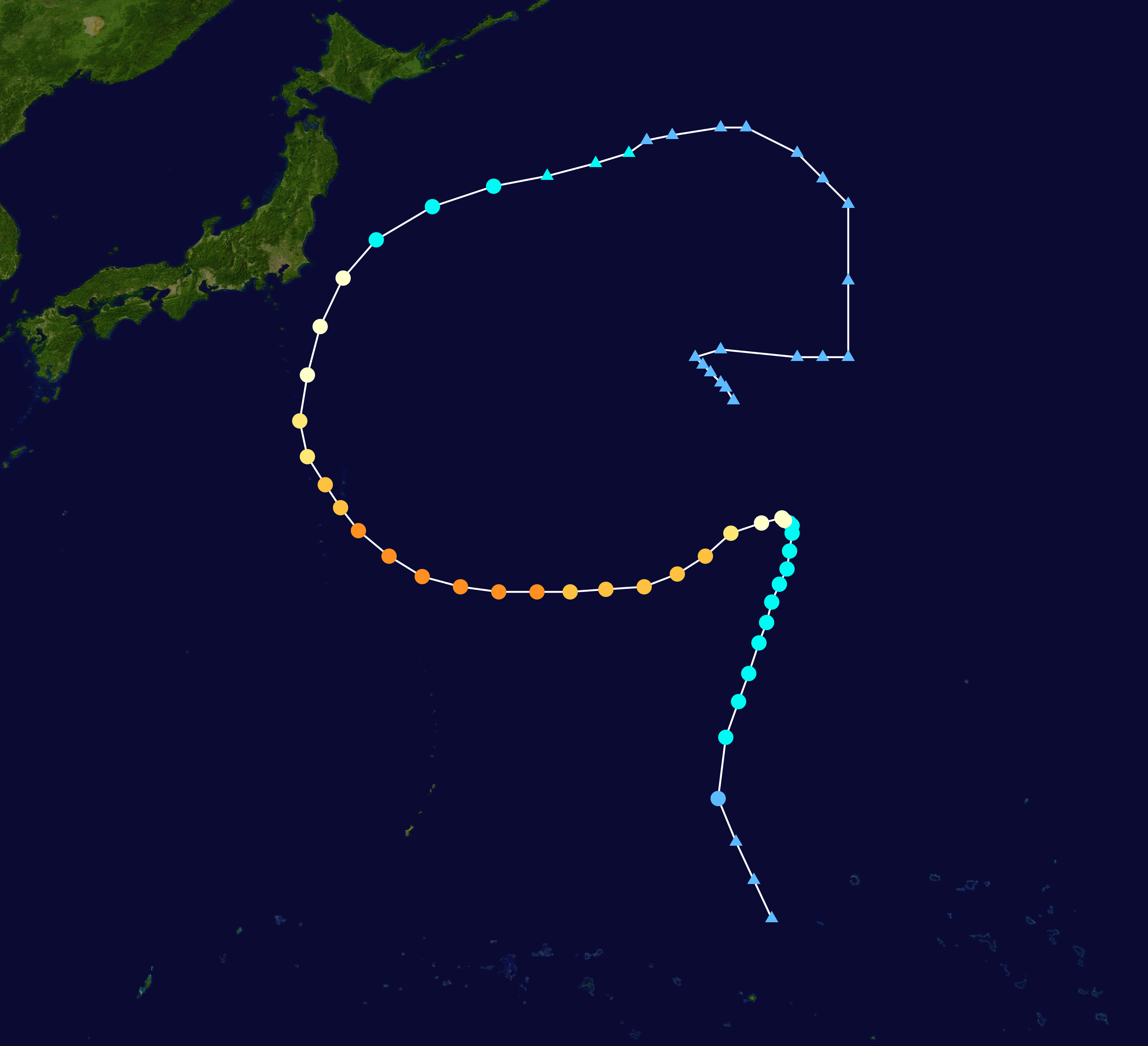
- Duration: August 23 – August 31
- Peak intensity: 230 km/h (145 mph) (1-min); 945 hPa (mbar)

An aera of low pressure formed near the Micronesia islands on August 21. It developed into tropical storm Faye on August 22. Over the next few days, the storm moved northeast, slowly developing. On August 25, the storm turned west and intensified into a typhoon. Three days later, it reached peak intensity of 230km/h (145 mph). It curved north, passing Japan, and turned extratropical on August 31. The storm eventually dissipated on September 5.

=== Tropical Storm Gloria ===
- Tropical depression (JMA)
- Tropical storm (SSHWS)
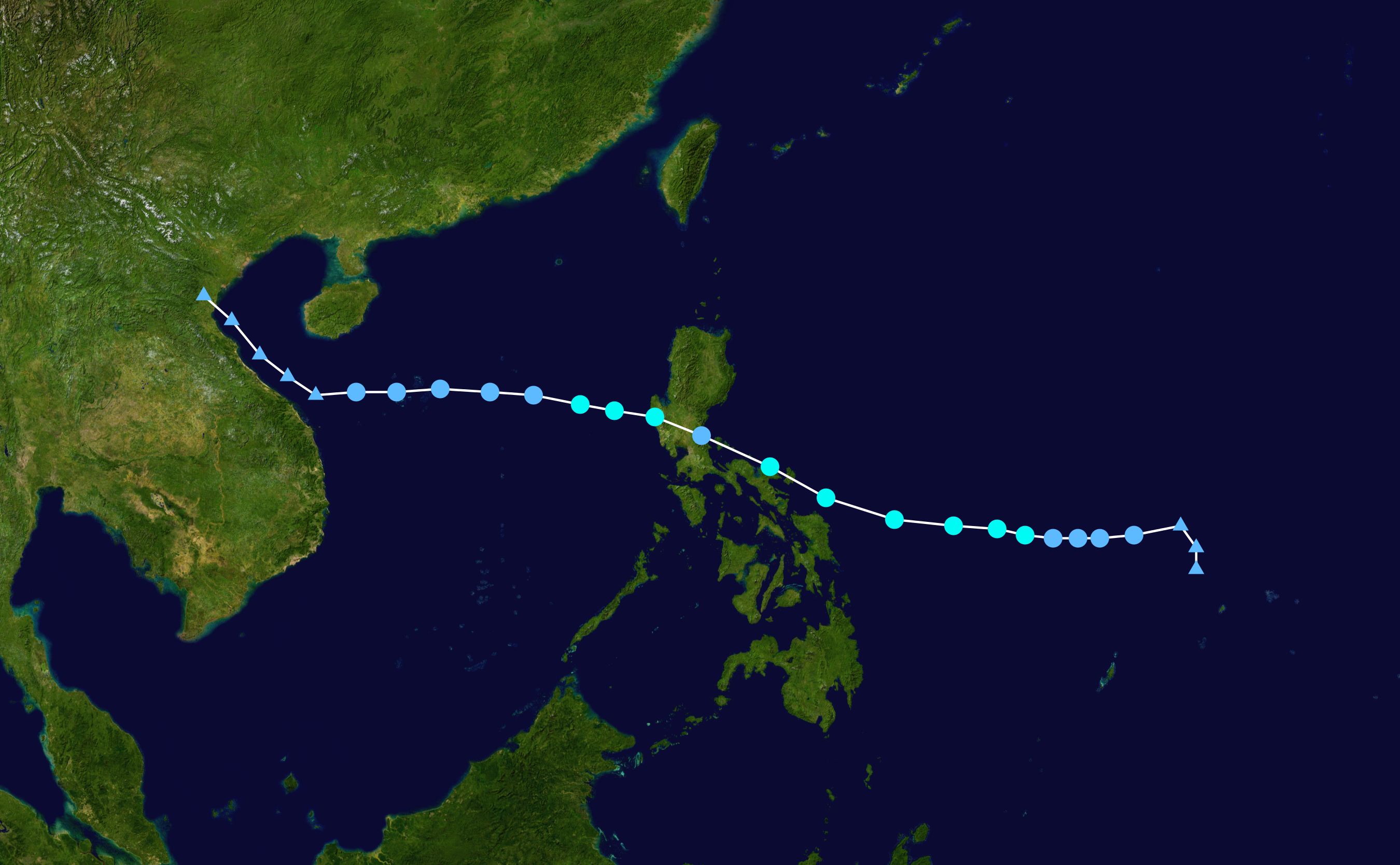
- Duration: August 30 – September 4
- Peak intensity: 85 km/h (50 mph) (1-min); 1000 hPa (mbar)

Gloria hit the Philippines.

=== JMA Tropical Storm Nineteen ===
- Tropical storm (JMA)
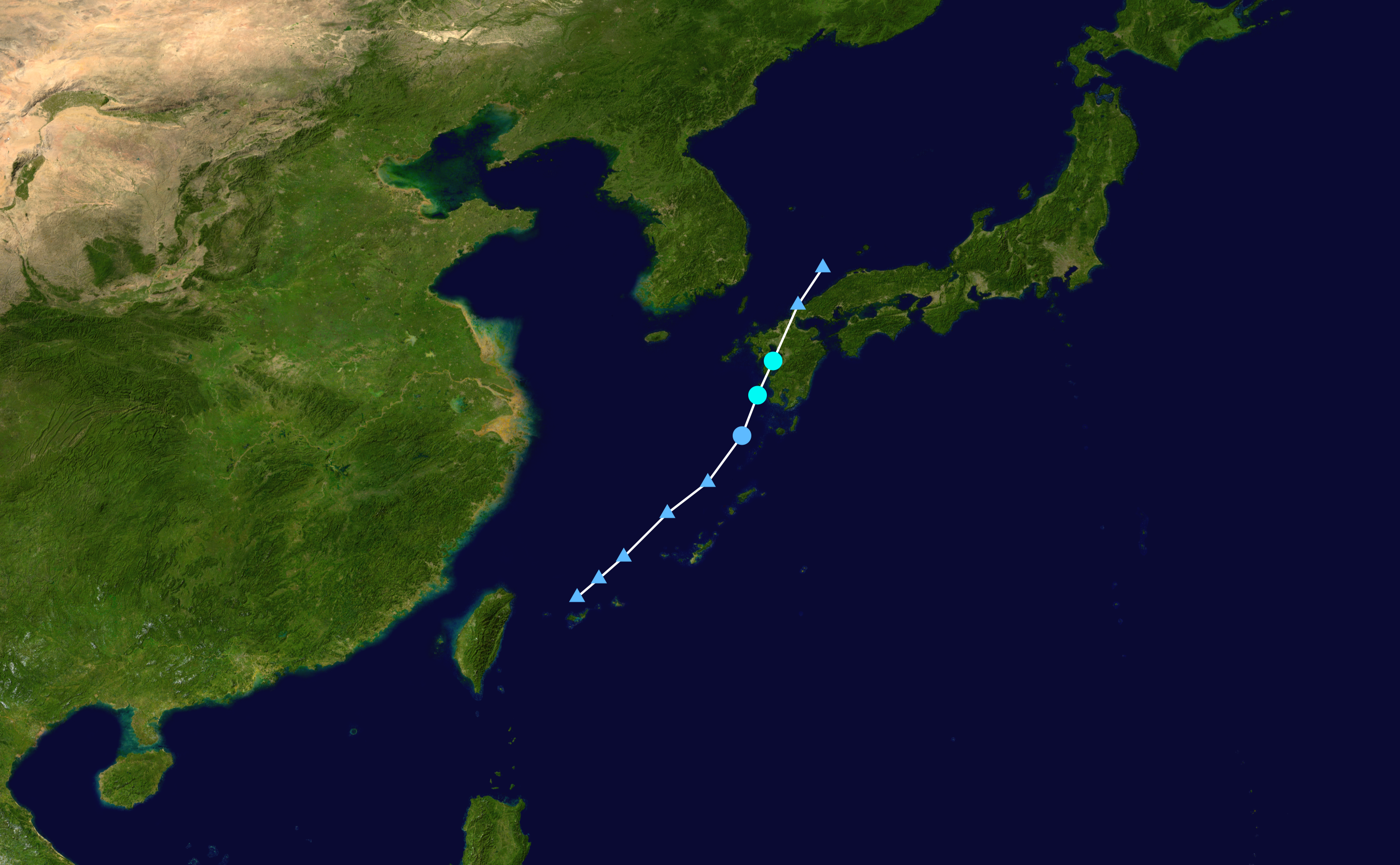
- Duration: August 31 – September 1
- Peak intensity: Winds not specified; 1008 hPa (mbar)

The storm hit Japan.

=== Tropical Storm Hester ===
- Tropical storm (JMA)
- Tropical storm (SSHWS)
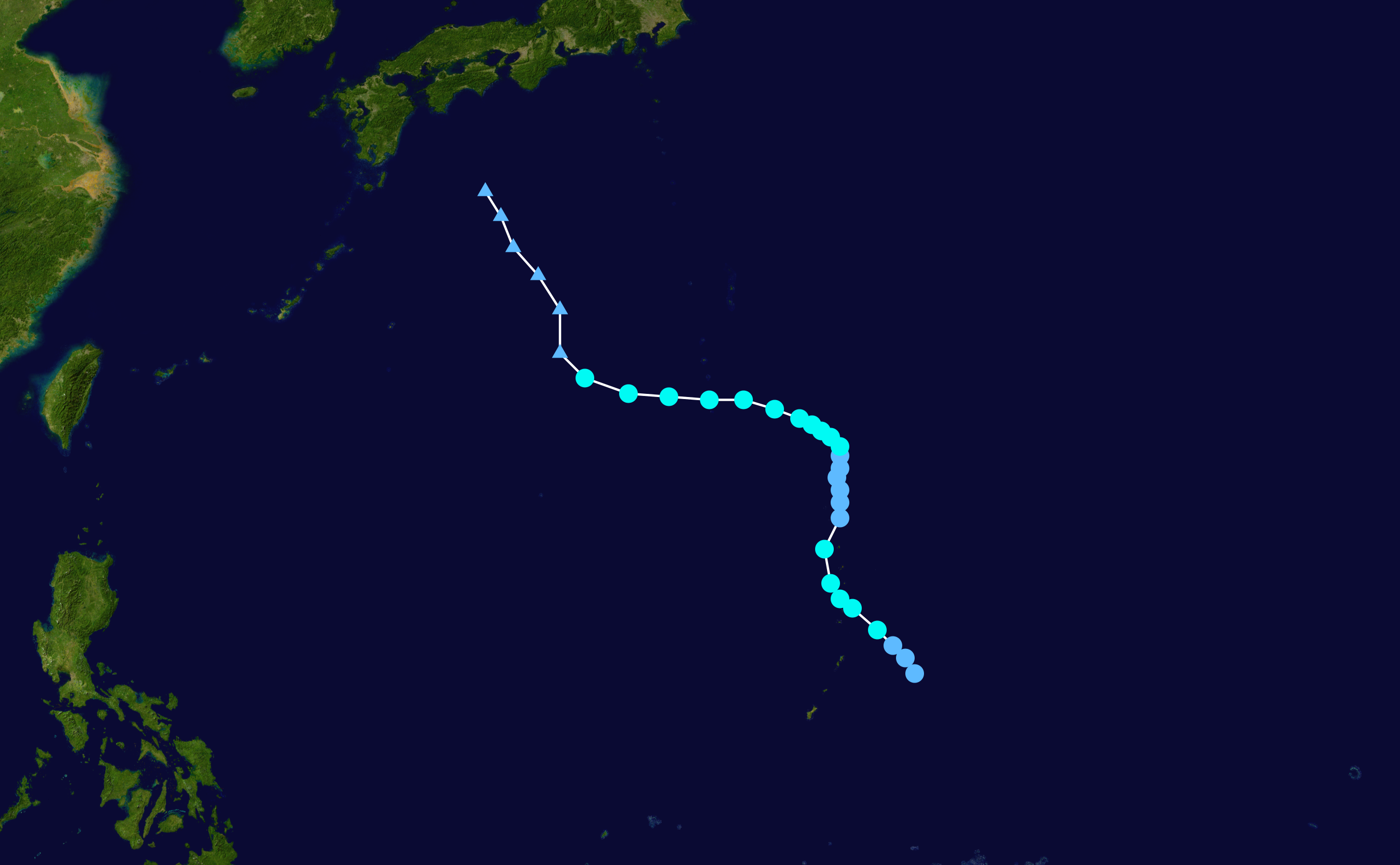
- Duration: September 4 – September 11
- Peak intensity: 75 km/h (45 mph) (1-min); 1000 hPa (mbar)

Hester was a tropical storm that didn't make landfall.

=== Tropical Depression Irma ===
- Tropical depression (JMA)
- Tropical storm (SSHWS)
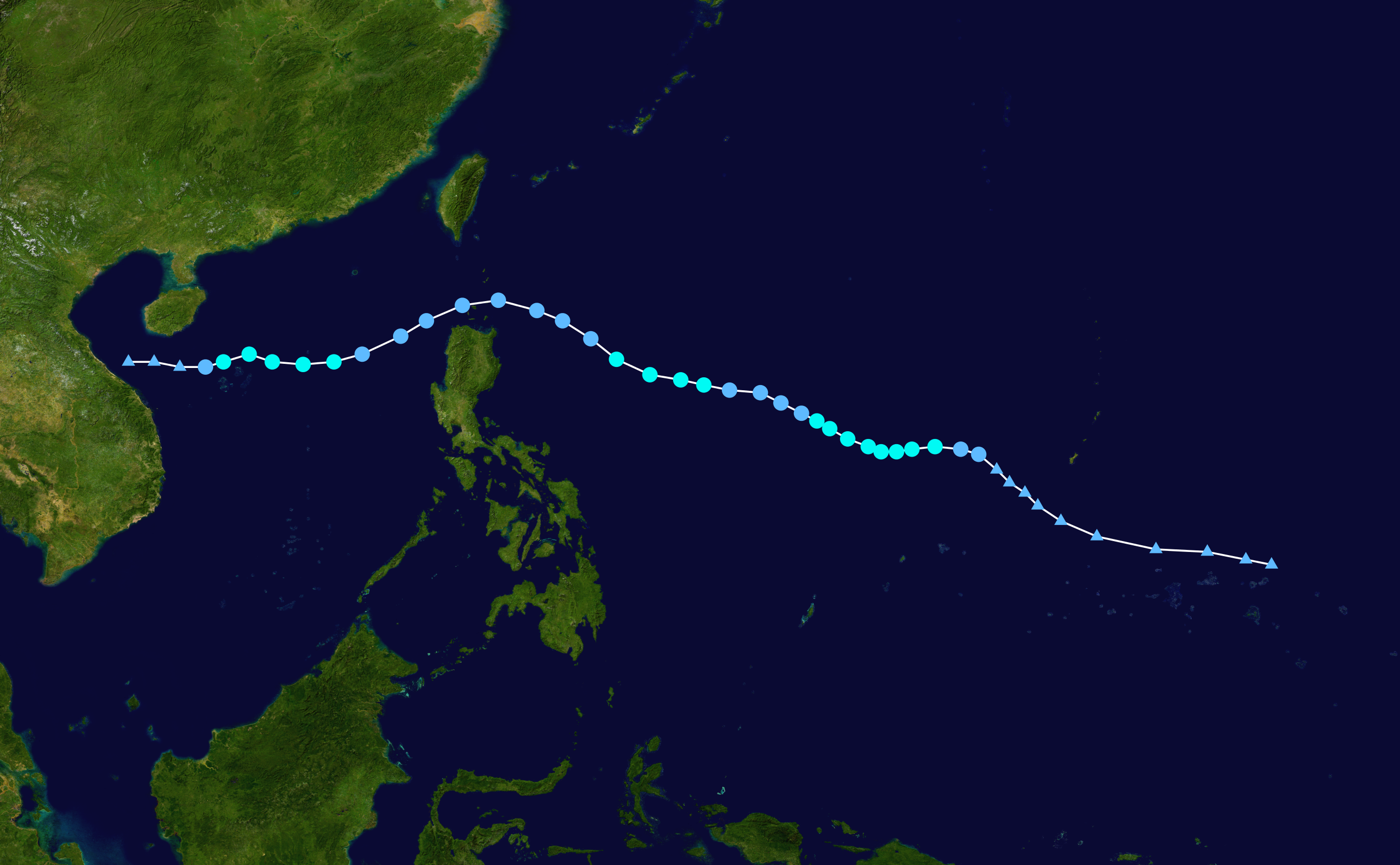
- Duration: September 11 – September 19
- Peak intensity: 75 km/h (45 mph) (1-min); 1000 hPa (mbar)

Irma affected the Philippines, but didn't make landfall.

=== Typhoon Judy ===
- Typhoon (JMA)
- Category 1-equivalent typhoon (SSHWS)
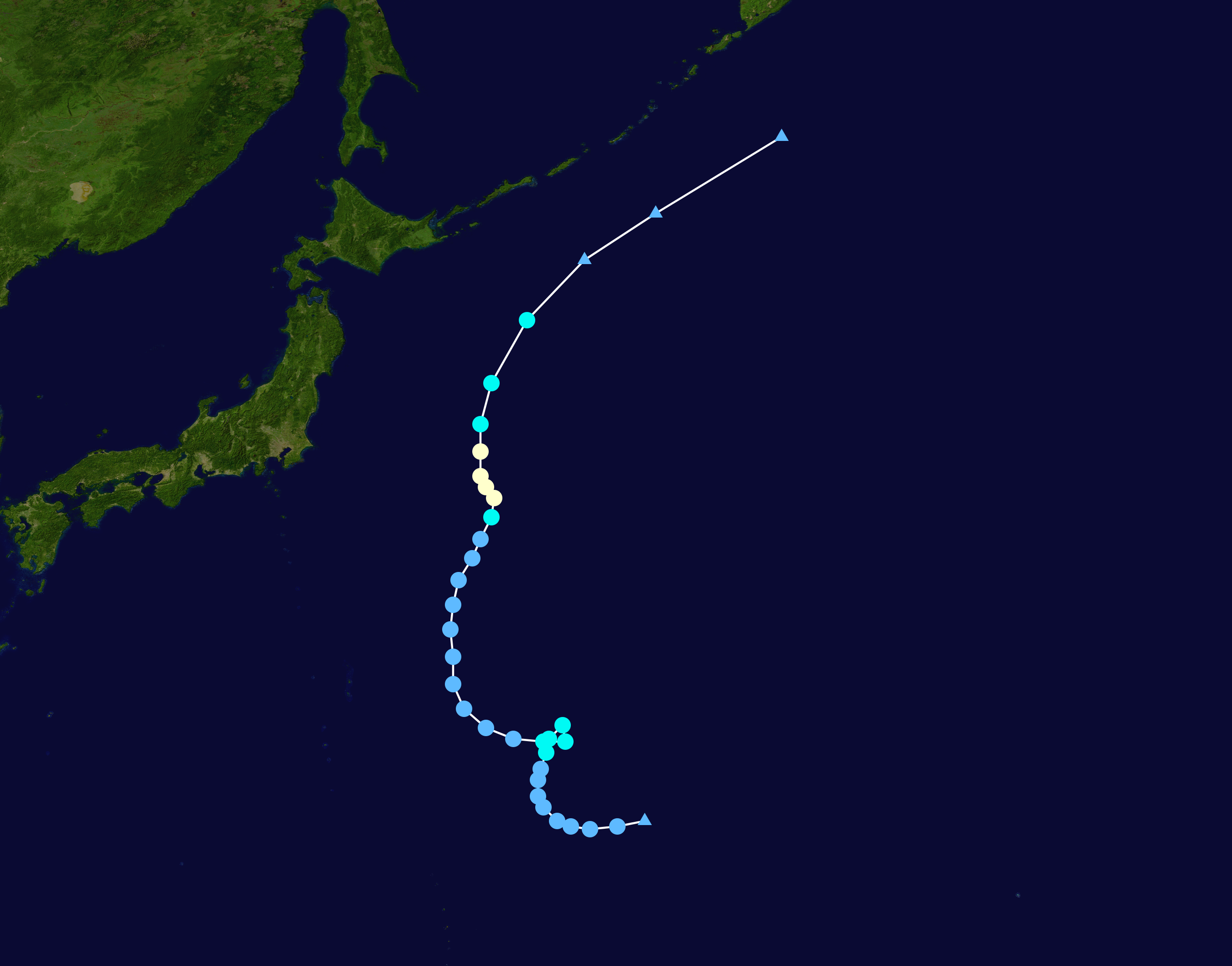
- Duration: September 23 – October 1
- Peak intensity: 150 km/h (90 mph) (1-min); 980 hPa (mbar)

Judy was a category 1 typhoon that remained out to sea.

=== Typhoon Kit ===
- Typhoon (JMA)
- Category 2-equivalent typhoon (SSHWS)
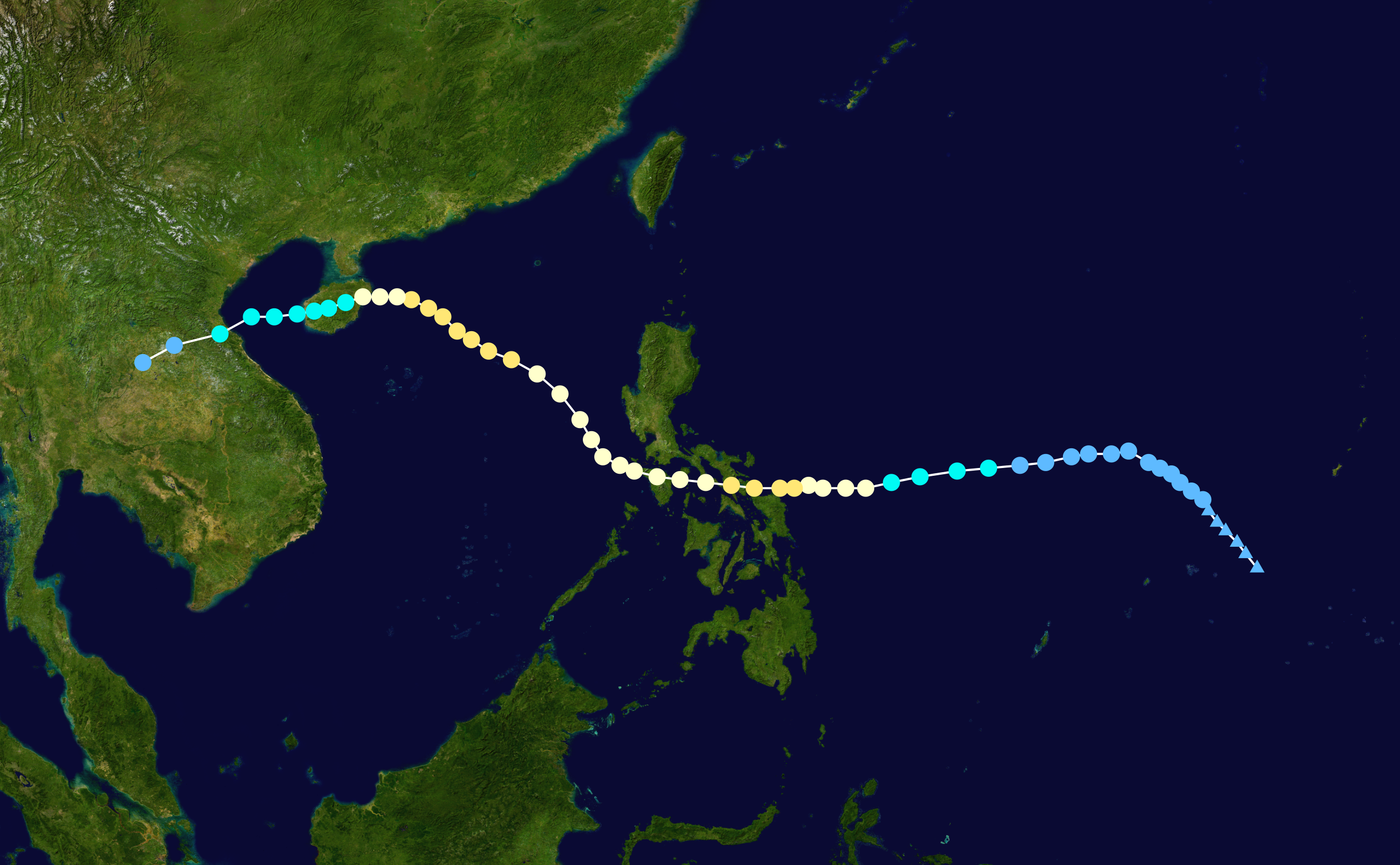
- Duration: October 3 – October 13
- Peak intensity: 165 km/h (105 mph) (1-min); 960 hPa (mbar)

A large circulation over the Western Pacific organized into a tropical depression on October 2. It moved westward, steadily strengthening to a peak of 100 mph (160 km/h). Kit made landfall on the eastern Philippines at that intensity on the 6th and quickly crossed the archipelago. It turned to the northwest over the South China Sea and struck eastern Hainan Island on the 11th. Kit turned to the southwest, and after weakening hit northeastern Vietnam as a minimal tropical storm on the 13th. Kit dissipated shortly thereafter.

Many small and large boats sank from Kit's 1000+ mile wide circulation, with 149 fishermen missing. In the Philippines, Kit's extensive rainfall caused severe damage to property and transportation damage. Especially damaged was the rice crop, which was affected during the rice harvesting season. In all, Kit caused 149 casualties (with 149 missing) and $3 million in damage. Extensive crop damage occurred as well in China.

=== Typhoon Lola ===
- Typhoon (JMA)
- Category 1-equivalent typhoon (SSHWS)
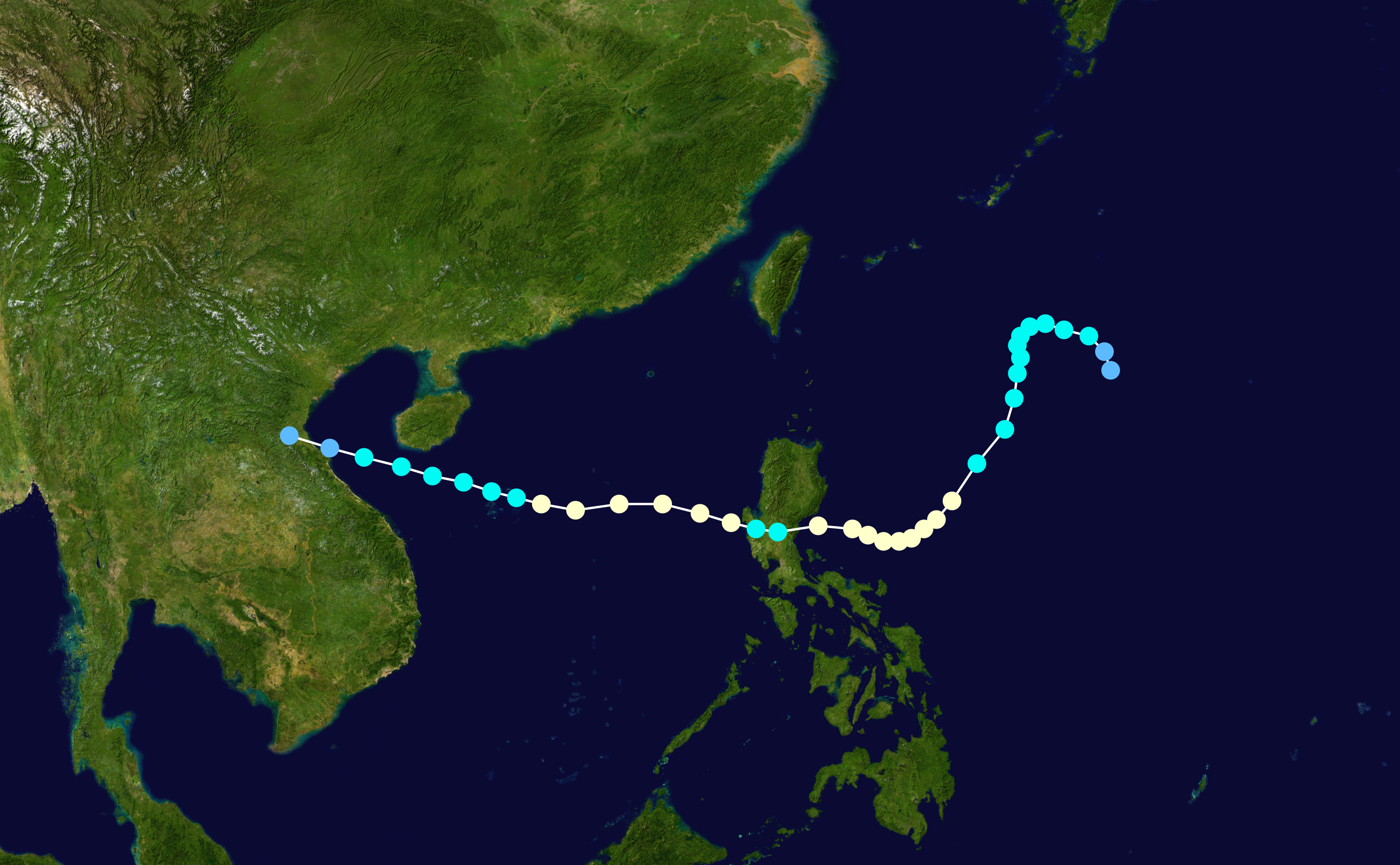
- Duration: October 8 – October 17
- Peak intensity: 150 km/h (90 mph) (1-min); 970 hPa (mbar)

Typhoon Lola hit the Philippines just days after Kit made landfall, resulting in an additional $15 million in damage, much of it to the rice crop. 58 people were killed from the flooding, and heavy damage occurred to highways and communication systems.

=== Typhoon Mamie ===
- Typhoon (JMA)
- Category 4-equivalent typhoon (SSHWS)
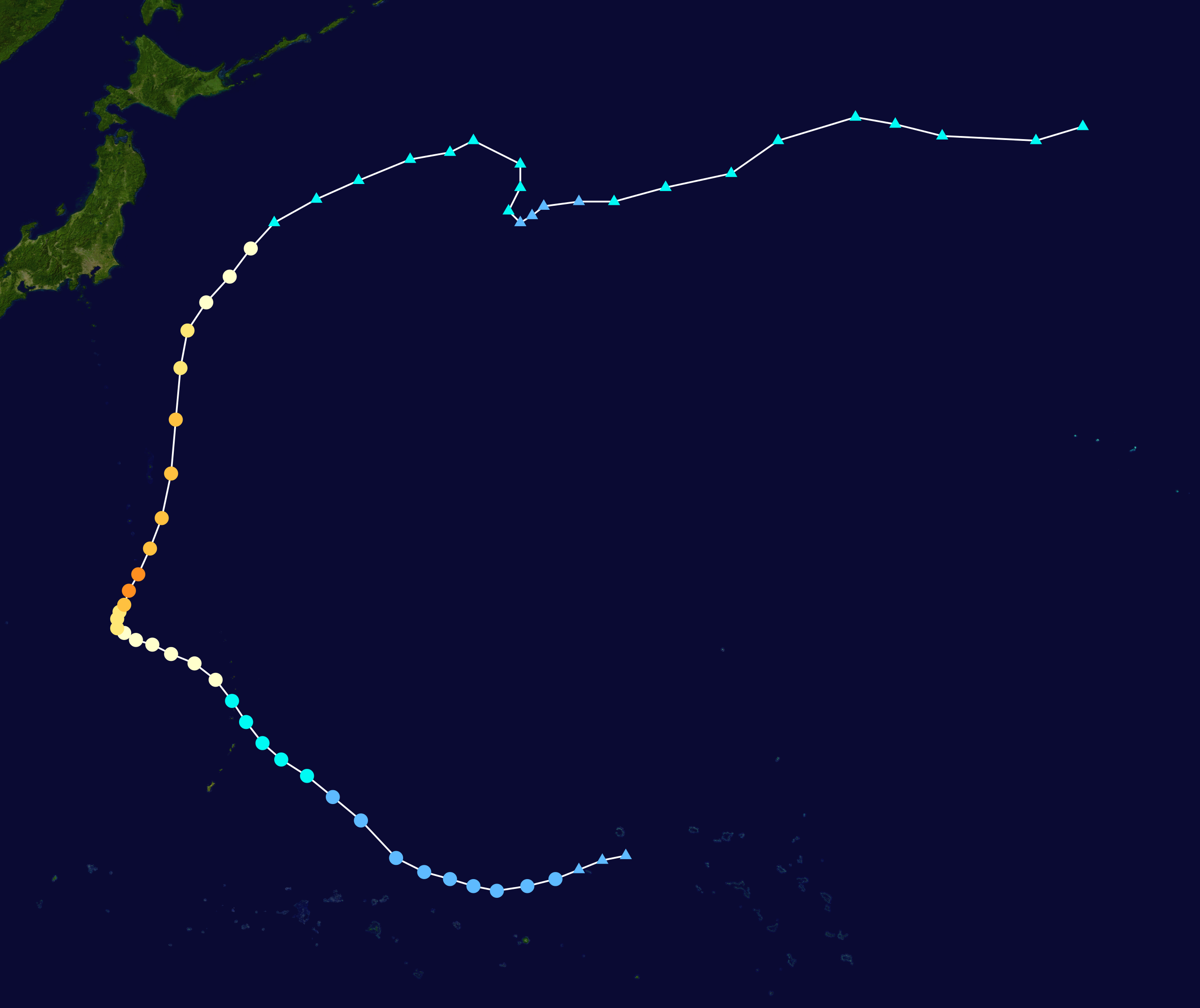
- Duration: October 11 – October 20
- Peak intensity: 215 km/h (130 mph) (1-min); 940 hPa (mbar)

Typhoon Mamie struck Iwo Jima with winds of 105 mph (169 km/h) then passed to the southeast of Tokyo. No damage was reported.

=== Typhoon Nina ===
- Typhoon (JMA)
- Category 3-equivalent typhoon (SSHWS)
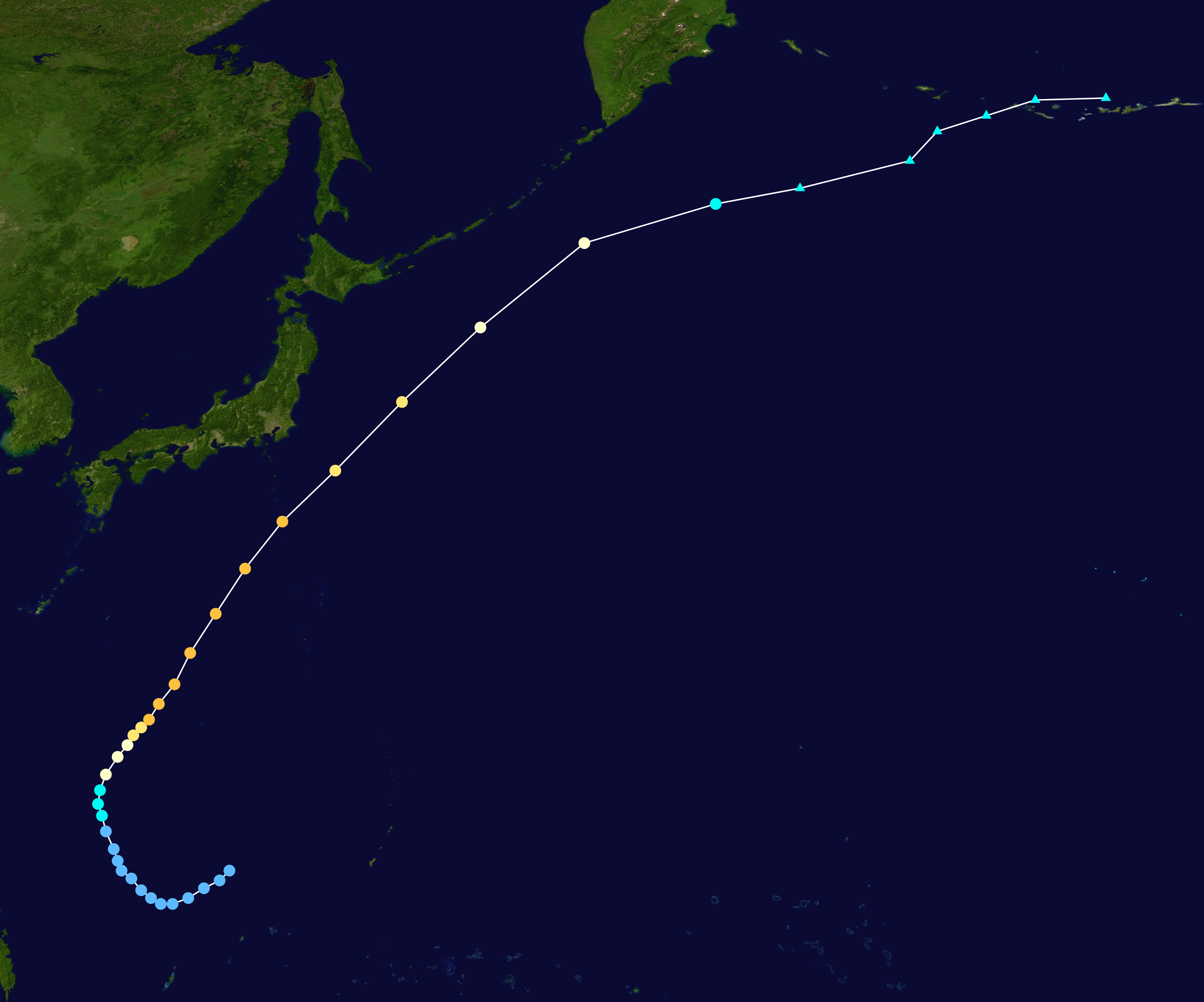
- Duration: October 20 – October 28
- Peak intensity: 205 km/h (125 mph) (1-min); 950 hPa (mbar)

Nina formed on October 20 west of Guam. It traveled north, reaching peak intensity of 110 knots wind and lowest central pressure of 950hPa. It passed Japan without making landfall before dissipating on October 28.

=== Typhoon Ophelia ===
- Typhoon (JMA)
- Category 4-equivalent typhoon (SSHWS)
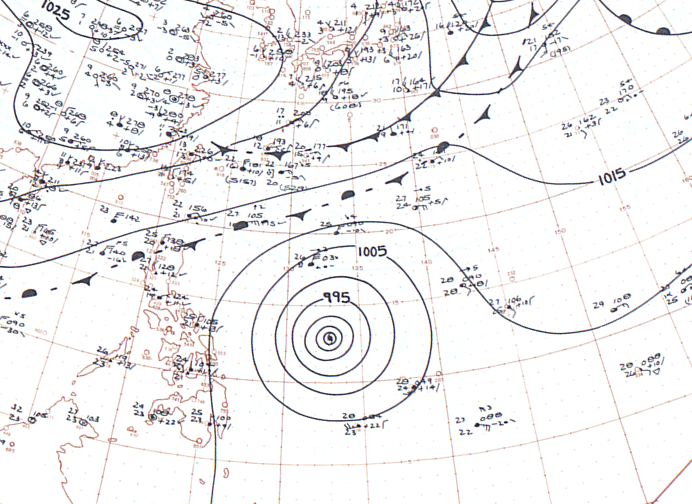
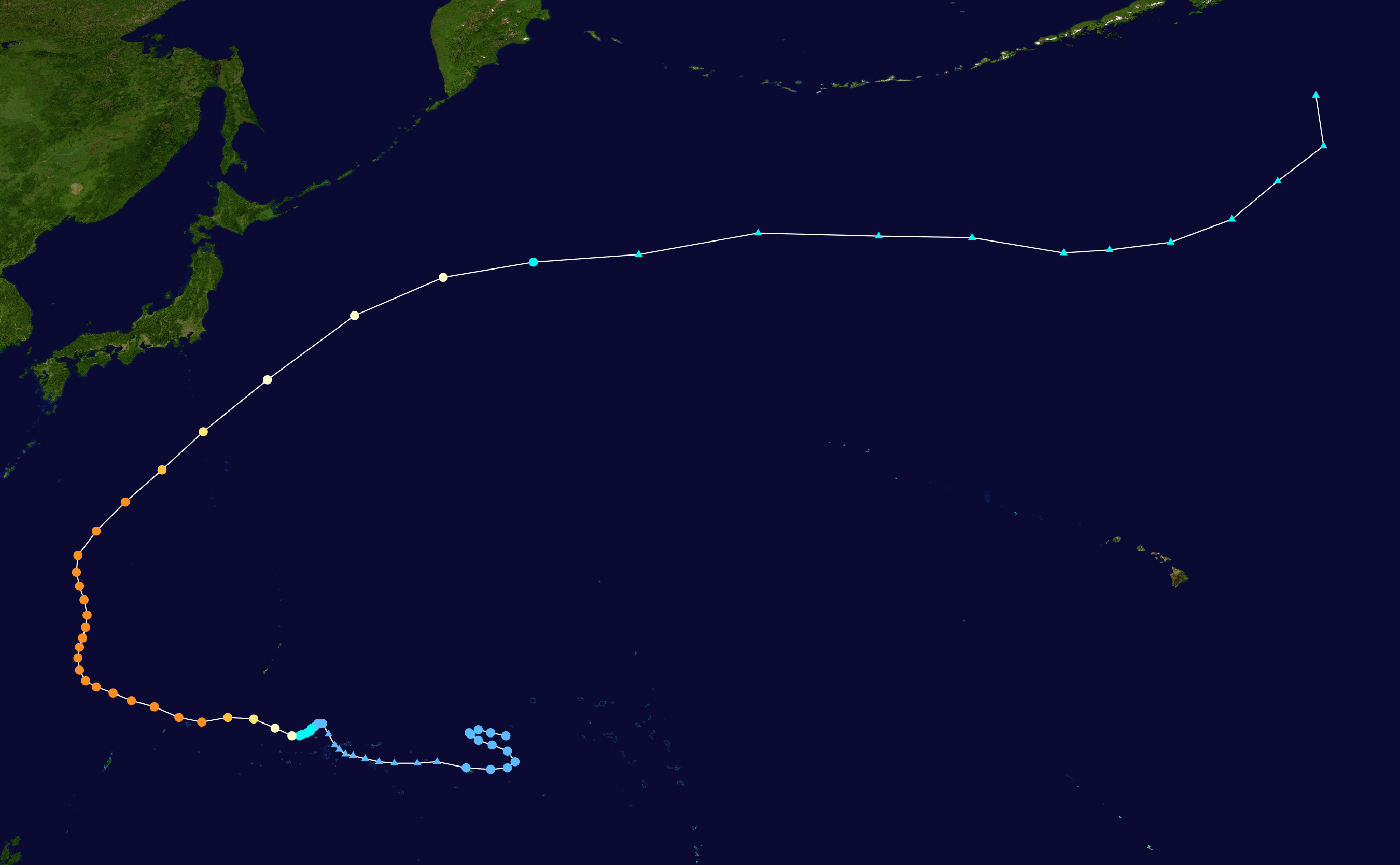
- Duration: November 25 – December 6
- Peak intensity: 250 km/h (155 mph) (1-min); 925 hPa (mbar)

The most unusual tropical cyclone of the year began its life on November 21 in the open Western Pacific. The depression drifted, first to the west, then to the southeast, then back to the west, varying between a tropical depression and an open trough of low pressure. After a northward turn, it strengthened into a tropical storm on the 27th and turned back to the southwest. Ophelia turned to a west drift, and under favorable conditions, intensified into a typhoon on the 29th. It continued to strengthen as it crossed over the Caroline Islands, and became a super typhoon on the 30th. A day later it reached a peak of 155 mph (249 km/h), but a northward turn weakened it to 150 mph (240 km/h). Ophelia remained a Category 4 typhoons until December 4, when it began accelerating to the northeast over unfavorable conditions. After weakening to a tropical storm on the 6th, Ophelia became extratropical over the Northern Pacific Ocean. As an extratropical storm, it persisted until dissipating south of Alaska on the 8th. Ophelia brought heavy rains to the Caroline Islands, killing 2 and injuring 4. Many of the islands were covered in up to 2 feet (0.61 m) of water, and they experienced severe damage from Ophelia's strong winds. The name Ophelia was retired after this storm. Over the course of Ophelia's life, it traveled 5,000 miles.

=== Typhoon Phyllis ===
- Typhoon (JMA)
- Category 3-equivalent typhoon (SSHWS)
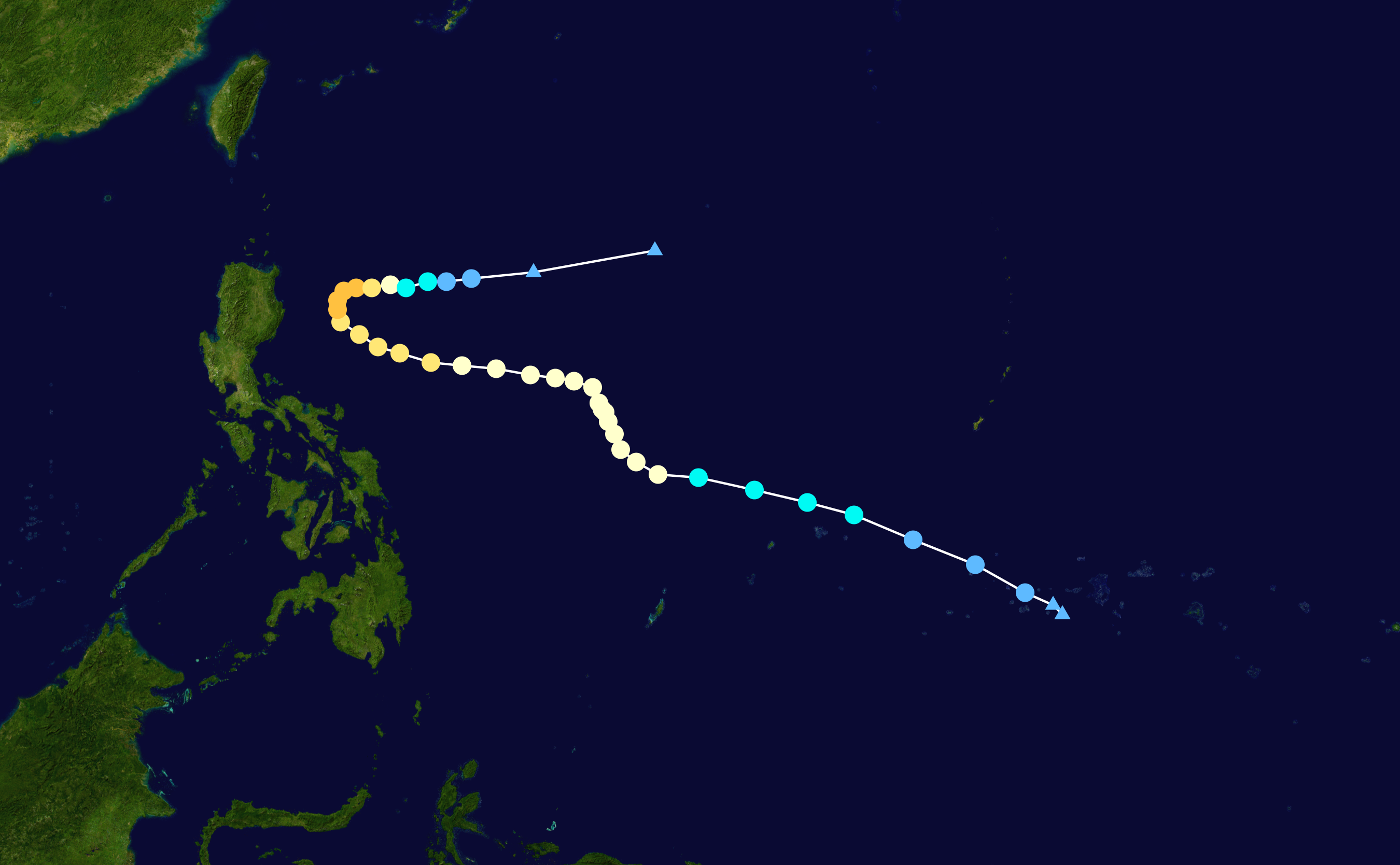
- Duration: December 11 – December 20
- Peak intensity: 195 km/h (120 mph) (1-min); 965 hPa (mbar)

Phyllis formed on December 11 east of the Philippines. It traveled west, reaching peak intensity as a category 3 typhoon east of Luzon, while turning sharply towards east. The storm dissipated on December 20, without making any landfall.

=== Other systems ===
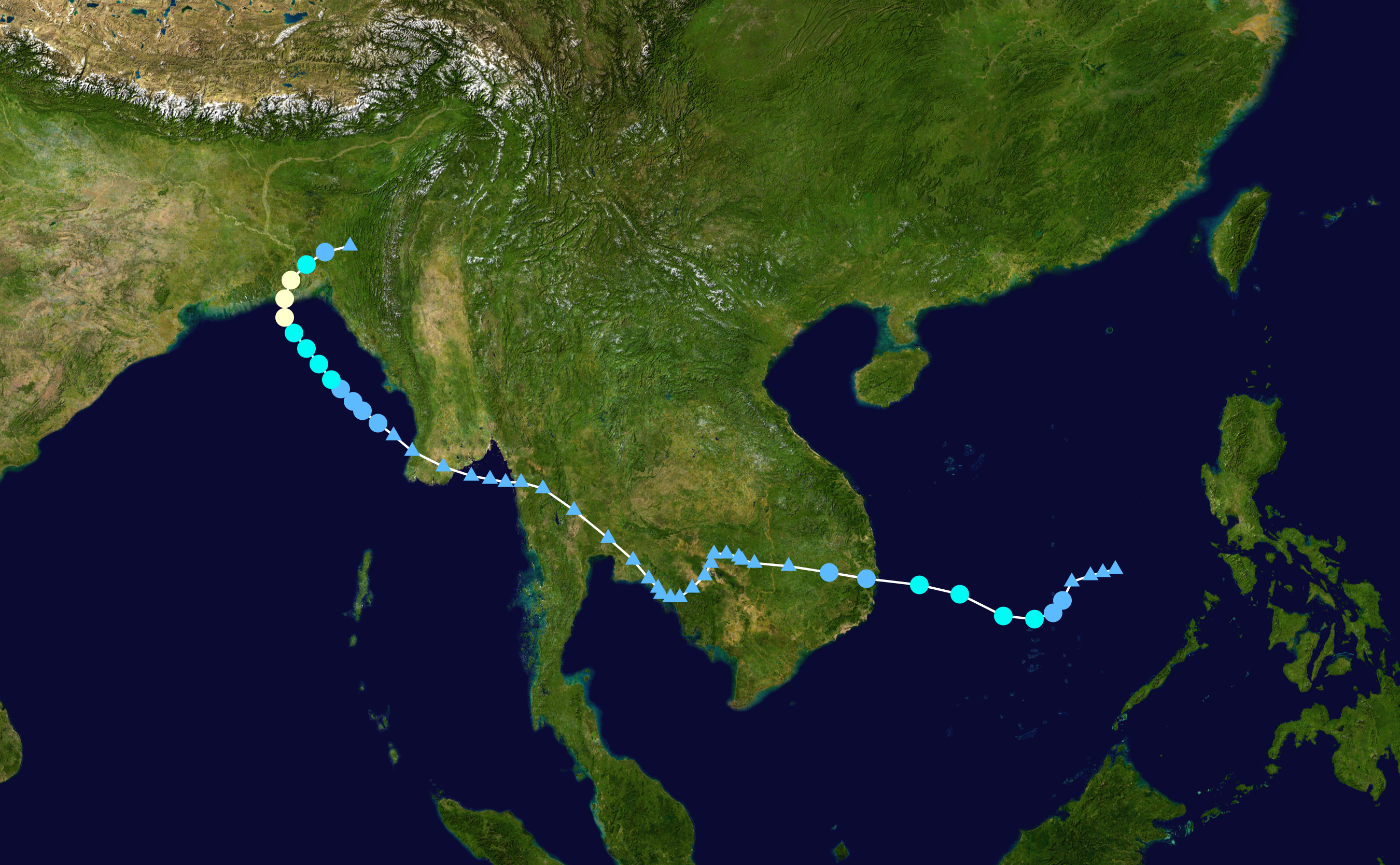
Track of the unnamed storm that became Cyclone 10B

The China Meteorological Administration also monitored a severe tropical storm and several other tropical depressions during the course of the season.

- June 22–27, 45 km/h (30 mph) 1000 mbar (hPa; 29.53 inHg)
- July 29 – August 3, 55 km/h (35 mph) 995 mbar (hPa; 29.38 inHg)
- August 5–7, 45 km/h (30 mph) 997 mbar (hPa; 29.44 inHg)
- August 13–16, 55 km/h (35 mph) 996 mbar (hPa; 29.41 inHg)
- September 15–16, 45 km/h (30 mph) 998 mbar (hPa; 29.47 inHg)
- September 22–27, 45 km/h (30 mph) 998 mbar (hPa; 29.47 inHg)
- Unnamed Severe Tropical Storm: September 28 – October 5, 95 km/h (60 mph) 992 mbar (hPa; 29.29 inHg)
  - Storm crossed 100°E and entered the Northern Indian Ocean cyclone basin. This system ultimately developed into a very severe cyclonic storm, designated Cyclone 10B by the JTWC, with three-minute sustained winds of 120 km/h (75 mph) before striking East Pakistan (modern-day Bangladesh). There, the storm damaged or destroyed roughly 35,000 homes and killed an estimated 3,000 people.
- November 8–10, 45 km/h (30 mph) 1005 mbar (hPa; 29.68 inHg)

== Storm names ==
Since 1947, the Joint Typhoon Warning Center unofficially named typhoons in the Western Pacific Basin. This followed the widespread practice of naming storms during World War II map discussions after girlfriends. Before 1979, all names assigned to storms were female.

- Ivy
- Jean
- Karen
- Lucille
- Mary
- Nadine
- Olive
- Polly
- Rose
- Shirley
- Trix
- Virginia
- Wendy
- Agnes
- Bess
- Carmen
- Della
- Elaine
- Faye
- Gloria
- Hester
- Irma
- Judy
- Kit
- Lola
- Mamie
- Nina
- Ophelia
- Phyllis

== Other storms ==
Typhoon Harriet lasted over from 1959, and dissipated on January 3.

== Retirement ==
Following the 1960 season, Lucille and Ophelia's names were retired. The former was removed in light of the considerable loss of life in the Philippines; the latter was stricken due to its unusually long track. These were the first two names to ever be removed from the rotating naming list in the basin, though they were not replaced (although the names Lucy and Ora took their places in 1962 and 1963 respectively).

== See also ==
- 1960 Atlantic hurricane season
- 1960 Pacific hurricane season
- 1960 North Indian Ocean cyclone season
- Australian region cyclone seasons: 1959–60 1960–61
- South Pacific cyclone seasons: 1959–60 1960–61
- South-West Indian Ocean cyclone seasons: 1959–60 1960–61
