= Tropical Storm Brenda (1960) =

Atlantic tropical cyclone

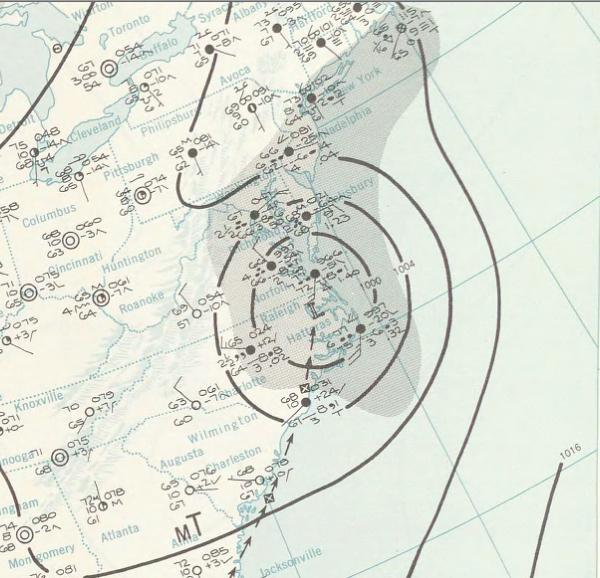
- Weather map of Brenda

Meteorological history
- Formed: July 28, 1960
- Extratropical: July 31
- Dissipated: August 1, 1960

Tropical storm
- 1-minute sustained (SSHWS/NWS)
- Highest winds: 70 mph (110 km/h)
- Lowest pressure: 991 mbar (hPa); 29.26 inHg

Overall effects
- Fatalities: ≥1 indirect
- Damage: $5 million (1960 USD)
- Areas affected: Gulf Coast of the United States, East Coast of the United States, Eastern Canada
- IBTrACS
- Part of the 1960 Atlantic hurricane season

Tropical Storm Brenda was the second named storm of the 1960 Atlantic hurricane season. It developed in the northeastern Gulf of Mexico on July 28, and after moving ashore over the Florida Peninsula, it attained tropical storm status. It accelerated northeast along the U.S. East Coast, ultimately peaking as a moderate storm with winds of 60 mph (97 km/h) before crossing the Mid-Atlantic states and New England; it dissipated on July 31 over southern Canada. It inflicted moderate damage in Florida, the worst since Hurricane Easy of 1950, and dropped heavy rainfall as far north as New York City. Its total damage was estimated at US$5 million, and only indirect deaths were blamed on it.

== Meteorological history ==
Map plotting the storm's track and intensity, according to the Saffir–Simpson scale Map key Saffir–Simpson scale Tropical depression (≤38 mph, ≤62 km/h) Tropical storm (39–73 mph, 63–118 km/h) Category 1 (74–95 mph, 119–153 km/h) Category 2 (96–110 mph, 154–177 km/h) Category 3 (111–129 mph, 178–208 km/h) Category 4 (130–156 mph, 209–251 km/h) Category 5 (≥157 mph, ≥252 km/h) Unknown Storm type Tropical cyclone Subtropical cyclone Extratropical cyclone, remnant low, tropical disturbance, or monsoon depression

A weak low-pressure area that organized in the northeast Gulf of Mexico began to intensify on July 28, while located west of the Tampa Bay. Early in its life, the system had a broad circulation with primarily light winds, similar to that of a subtropical storm. The storm is estimated to have become a tropical depression earlier the previous day as it moved toward the northeast. It made landfall along the Florida coast near Cross City and continued inland, gradually accelerating. It likely attained tropical storm status at around 1200 UTC on July 28 while its center was situated west of Tampa. The cyclone was named Brenda after reconnaissance aircraft confirmed that it had reached tropical storm strength.

Brenda tracked northward, hugging the Georgia and South Carolina coasts before moving inland over North Carolina on July 29. It attained its peak winds of 60 mph (97 km/h) late that evening, while situated south of Wilmington. The next morning, the storm emerged over the Chesapeake Bay moving northeast at about 30 mph (48 km/h). Brenda crossed the Delmarva Peninsula and rapidly tracked into southern New Jersey. The storm crossed the state and eventually made another landfall in Brooklyn, New York before making yet another landfall in coastal Connecticut.

At around 0000 UTC on July 31, Brenda moved into Massachusetts. Shortly thereafter, it lost its tropical characteristics and transitioned into an extratropical cyclone. It dissipated by August 1 over southern Canada. Because Brenda was in the vicinity of land for most of its course, it was not able to intensify beyond tropical storm status.

== Preparations and impact ==
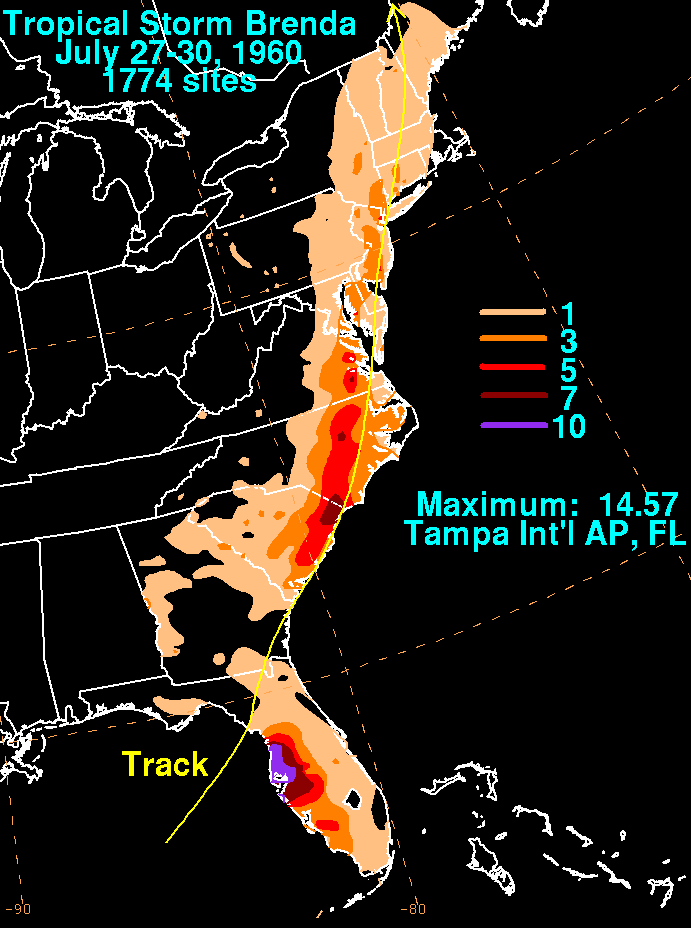
Storm total rainfall for Brenda (1960)

In advance of the storm, tropical storm advisories and wind warnings were issued from Florida to Maine.

Rainfall from Tropical Storm Brenda affected at least 16 states. The heaviest precipitation fell in western Florida near Tampa, east of the storm's center; the Tampa International Airport recorded 14.57 in (370 mm) of rainfall. Extensive flooding occurred in the west-central Florida Peninsula. Wind gusts exceeded 60 mph (97 km/h), and the storm produced 10 ft (3.0 m) high waves along the coast, leading to considerable erosion. Around the Naples area, small boat and dock facilities and roads sustained damage. A private seawall at Clearwater was breached in two places by the cyclone. Brenda was considered the worst storm to strike the area since Hurricane Easy in 1950. At least one traffic-related death took place. According to an American Red Cross Disaster Service report encompassing eight Florida counties, 11 houses sustained significant damage, while 567 suffered more minor damage. Around 590 families were affected overall. Total monetary damage is placed at near $5 million.

Tides along the Outer Banks of North Carolina were generally reported at 2 ft (0.61 m) above-normal. In and around Wilmington, the storm caused minor damage to roofs and windows of some beachfront structures. Power was temporarily interrupted due to fallen tree limbs. Heavy rainfall caused flooding on streams and rivers, and in some areas the precipitation helped to end a serious drought. Some boats were swamped, and the winds ripped the roof off a cottage at Long Beach. The heavy rain and high tides flooded tobacco fields.

Moderate rains extended northward into the Mid-Atlantic states, with lighter totals reported farther north in New York. At New York City, 4.79 in (122 mm) of precipitation fell, beating the one-day July record of 3.80 in (97 mm) set in 1872. The heavy rains flooded parts of LaGuardia Airport. Elsewhere, reports of 3 to 5 in (76 to 127 mm) were common throughout New Jersey, Delaware, Maryland and Virginia. High winds also affected portions of the northeastern United States, gusting to 55 mph (89 km/h) across southern New England. Tides often ran 3 to 4 ft (0.91 to 1.22 m) above-normal throughout the region. The storm caused travel delays and ran several ships aground, but otherwise inflicted little serious damage. The storm forced the cancellation of two American League baseball games and the postponement of several other sporting events around the area.

== See also ==
- List of United States hurricanes
- List of Florida hurricanes
- List of New England hurricanes
