= 1960 Texas tropical storm =

Atlantic tropical storm in 1960

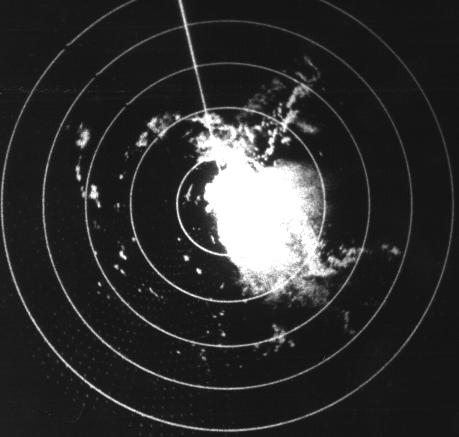
- The unnamed storm approaching Texas

Meteorological history
- Formed: June 22, 1960
- Dissipated: June 29, 1960

Tropical storm
- 1-minute sustained (SSHWS/NWS)
- Highest winds: 60 mph (95 km/h)
- Lowest pressure: 1000 mbar (hPa); 29.53 inHg

Overall effects
- Fatalities: 18 total
- Damage: $3.6 million (1960 USD)
- Areas affected: Mexico, Texas, Oklahoma, Arkansas, Missouri, Illinois
- IBTrACS
- Part of the 1960 Atlantic hurricane season

The 1960 Texas tropical storm brought severe but localized flooding to southeastern Texas in June 1960. The first tropical cyclone and first tropical storm of the 1960 Atlantic hurricane season, this system developed from an area of showers and thunderstorms in the Bay of Campeche on June 22. Initially a tropical depression, it strengthened and was estimated to have reached tropical storm status on June 23. Early on the following day, the storm peaked with winds of 60 mph (97 km/h). Later that day, it made landfall near Corpus Christi, Texas, at the same intensity. The storm weakened slowly and moved across the Central United States, before dissipating over Illinois on June 28.

In Texas, the storm dropped up to 29.76 inches (756 mm) of precipitation in Port Lavaca. Thus considerable flooding occurred in some areas of south and eastern Texas. Throughout the state, more than 150 houses sustained flood damage in several counties. In addition, numerous major highways were closed, including portions of U.S. Routes 59, 87, 90, and then-185, and Texas State Highways 35 and 71. In Arkansas, a few buildings in Hot Springs were damaged from high winds. Flooding in that state resulted in three deaths from drowning. Light to moderate rainfall was recorded in at least 11 other states, though damage was minimal. The storm was the rainiest tropical cyclone on record in the state of Kentucky, dropping 11.25 inches (286 mm) in Dunmor. Overall, 18 fatalities were attributed to the storm and $3.6 million (1960 USD) in damage was reported.

== Meteorological history ==
Map plotting the storm's track and intensity, according to the Saffir–Simpson scale Map key Saffir–Simpson scale Tropical depression (≤38 mph, ≤62 km/h) Tropical storm (39–73 mph, 63–118 km/h) Category 1 (74–95 mph, 119–153 km/h) Category 2 (96–110 mph, 154–177 km/h) Category 3 (111–129 mph, 178–208 km/h) Category 4 (130–156 mph, 209–251 km/h) Category 5 (≥157 mph, ≥252 km/h) Unknown Storm type Tropical cyclone Subtropical cyclone Extratropical cyclone, remnant low, tropical disturbance, or monsoon depression

In late June 1960, a large mass of deep convection developed in the Gulf of Mexico. A reconnaissance flight into the system on June 22 did not indicate a closed circulation. However, weather stations in Mexico reported a circulation and thus, it is estimated that the first tropical depression of the season developed at 0600 UTC on June 22. Early on June 23, barometric pressures in from Tampico, Tamaulipas to Brownsville, Texas had significantly decreased, which indicated that the tropical cyclone was moving generally northward. Shortly thereafter, another reconnaissance flight into the depression indicated winds of only 20 mph (32 km/h) and a barometric pressure of 1,006 mbar (29.7 inHg). However, the plane may not have flown under the most intense convection.

The depression gradually strengthened, and by 0600 UTC on June 23, it reached tropical storm status. Over Texas, airborne radars and the Dow Chemical Company radar in Freeport indicated curved convective banding associated with the storm. Though no wall cloud was reported, the Kelly Air Force Base reported a cloud center. The storm continued to intensify, peaking with winds of 60 mph (97 km/h) by 0000 UTC on June 24. At 0400 UTC that day, the tropical storm made landfall near Corpus Christi, Texas. After moving inland, the storm quickly weakened back to a tropical depression. Over the following 24 hours, the depression executed a small cyclonic loop over southern Texas. On June 26, the depression accelerated to the north-northeast, and eventually dissipated over northern Illinois on June 29 at 0000 UTC.

== Impact ==
=== Texas ===
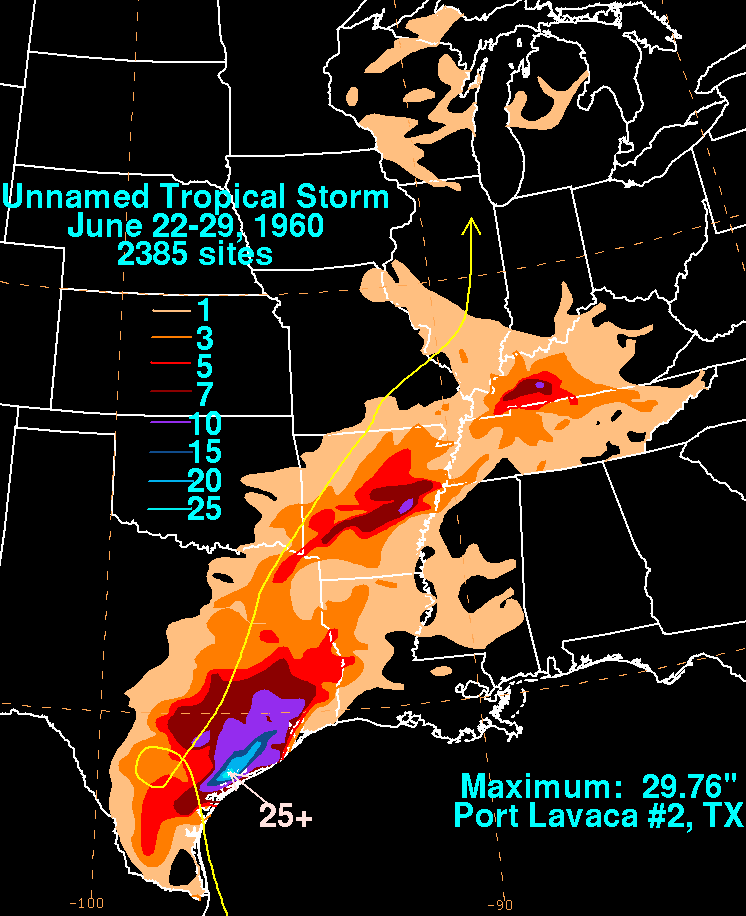
Rainfall totals associated with the Unnamed Tropical Storm

Some towns in Texas considered it the worst disaster since a hurricane in 1945. In Copano Bay, waves produced by the storm damaged three fishing piers; a shrimp boat also capsized, killing three people. In addition, another ship was beached. However, the tides measured were only 3.5 feet (1.1 m) above mean water levels. In Rockport, sustained winds reached 40 mph (64 km/h) and gusts were up to 60 mph (97 km/h). Padre Island Park also reported tropical storm force winds, with sustained winds of 50 mph (80 km/h) and gusts reaching 60 mph (97 km/h).

Heavy rainfall was reported, peaking at 29.76 inches (756 mm) in Port Lavaca. As a result, water 6 to 12 inches (150 to 300 mm) was reported in several homes and businesses in Port Lavaca. Two boys drowned in Port Lavaca after being swept by flood waters into the city harbor. Over 19 inches (480 mm) fell in Bay City. It was reported by the Bay City Tribune that all of Matagorda County was "under water". Due to large amounts of precipitation, portions of U.S. Routes 59, 87, 90, and then-185, and Texas State Highways 35 and 71. Rainfall totals in the Houston area peaked at more than 17 inches (430 mm). At the height of the storm, about one-fourth of the streets in Houston were flooded. Three subdivisions of the city were significantly affected by flooding: Alameda Plaza, Pleasantville, and Sunnyside. Many shingles were blown off the roof of a house, and then water caused the roof to collapse into the dining room and living room. However, no one was injured or killed. Several hundred people were evacuated from places with poor drainage or low-lying areas. Between 150 and 200 houses were affected by flooding and damaged estimates reached $1.5 million in Harris County alone. In addition, three people drowned in the flood waters in Houston.

Following the storm, the town of Port Lavaca requested aid from the United States Navy and Fourth United States Army. Later, cots and blankets were sent by helicopters and trucks. Three schools were opened as shelters for flood refugees in Port Lavaca. The Texas Department of State Health Services sent water and sanitation teams to the areas affected by the storm, as well as 3,000 shots of typhoid vaccine. In addition, Calhoun County was declared a disaster area. Overall, the storm caused $3.6 million and 15 fatalities in the state of Texas.

=== Elsewhere ===
Elsewhere along the Gulf Coast of the United States, light to moderate rainfall was reported in the states of Mississippi and Louisiana. In both states, affects were minimal, and rainfall was generally less than 5 inches (130 mm). To the north of Texas in the state of Oklahoma, precipitation was also light, peaking at 4.34 inches (110 mm) in Kiamichi. The storm brought moderate to heavy rainfall throughout Arkansas. Much of the state reported at least 3 inches (76 mm), while precipitation in some areas was more than 10 inches (250 mm). The Ouachita River reached flood stage at Arkadelphia. Three children drowned near Redfield after the car they were occupying was swept off U.S. Route 65 and fell into a ditch. Near Hot Springs, high winds damaged a few buildings. In Tennessee, much of the state reported precipitation, though it was generally no more than 5 inches (130 mm).

Heavy rainfall was reported in Kentucky, peaking at 11.25 inches (286 mm) in Dunmor, making it the wettest tropical cyclone in the history of that state. Light precipitation was reported in Illinois, Indiana, and Missouri; none of those states experienced more than 4 inches (100 mm) of rain. The storm dropped rainfall was far north as Michigan and Wisconsin. In those two states, precipitation was generally light, and did not exceed 3 inches (76 mm). Rainfall totals reached 2.83 and 2.28 inches (72 and 58 mm) in Wisconsin and Michigan, respectively.

== See also ==
- List of wettest tropical cyclones in the United States
- Hurricane Carla (1961)
- Tropical Storm Candy (1968)
- Tropical Storm Grace (2003)
