= Hurricane Abby (1960) =

Category 1 Atlantic hurricane in 1960

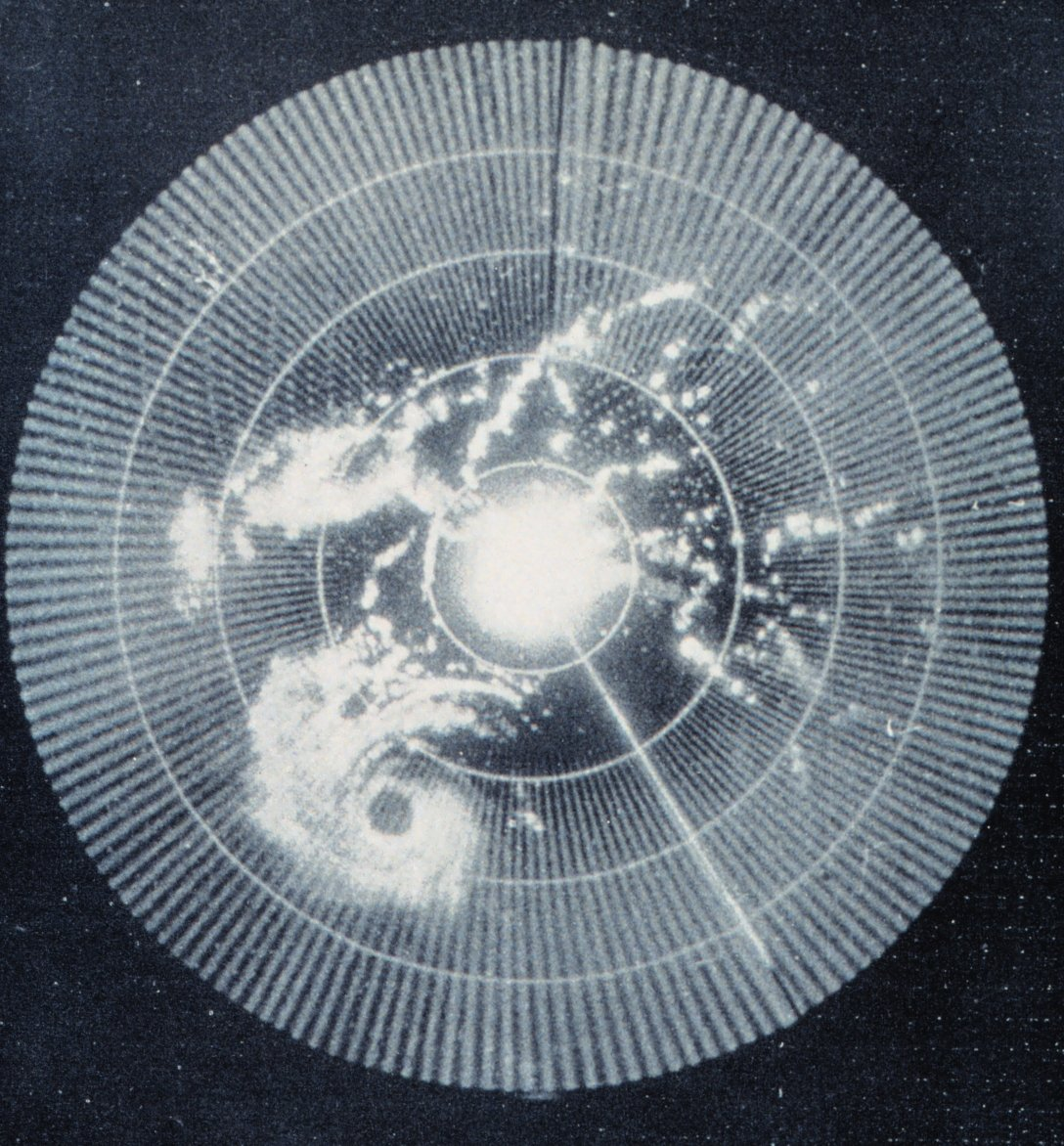
- Abby approaching landfall in Belize

Meteorological history
- Formed: July 10, 1960
- Dissipated: July 16, 1960

Category 1 hurricane
- 1-minute sustained (SSHWS/NWS)
- Highest winds: 80 mph (130 km/h)
- Lowest pressure: 995 mbar (hPa); 29.38 inHg

Overall effects
- Fatalities: 6
- Damage: $640,000 (1960 USD)
- Areas affected: Lesser Antilles, Puerto Rico, Leeward Antilles, Hispaniola, Jamaica, Nicaragua, Honduras, Belize, Guatemala, Mexico
- IBTrACS
- Part of the 1960 Atlantic hurricane season

Hurricane Abby was the only tropical cyclone in the Caribbean Sea during the 1960 Atlantic hurricane season. The second tropical cyclone and first named storm of the season, Abby developed on July 10 from a tropical wave in the vicinity of the Lesser Antilles. Abby rapidly intensified into a hurricane after being a tropical storm for less than six hours. It briefly peaked as a category 2 hurricane before weakening back. Abby rapidly weakened to a minimal tropical storm a few days thereafter. The storm re-strengthened into a hurricane as it began to parallel the coast of Honduras. Hurricane Abby made landfall in British Honduras (present-day Belize) on July 15. Abby dissipated over Mexico later the next day. The remnants of Abby ultimately became Hurricane Celeste in the Pacific Ocean. Despite passing through or near several countries, Hurricane Abby had a relatively light impact on land, resulting in just US$640,500 (1960 dollars, $7.02 million in 2026) in damage and six fatalities.

== Meteorological history ==
Map plotting the storm's track and intensity, according to the Saffir–Simpson scale Map key Saffir–Simpson scale Tropical depression (≤38 mph, ≤62 km/h) Tropical storm (39–73 mph, 63–118 km/h) Category 1 (74–95 mph, 119–153 km/h) Category 2 (96–110 mph, 154–177 km/h) Category 3 (111–129 mph, 178–208 km/h) Category 4 (130–156 mph, 209–251 km/h) Category 5 (≥157 mph, ≥252 km/h) Unknown Storm type Tropical cyclone Subtropical cyclone Extratropical cyclone, remnant low, tropical disturbance, or monsoon depression

The origins of Hurricane Abby were possibly from a tropical wave that moved in the vicinity of the Lesser Antilles in early July 1960. Ships and a few weather stations on July 9 reported the existence of a tropical cyclone. On July 9, it had operationally been classified as a tropical storm upon formation, though a later analysis revealed that it was only a tropical depression. The depression passed near Barbados early on July 10 before rapidly intensifying into a hurricane. Hurricane Abby accelerated toward the west and made landfall in St. Lucia as a minimal category 1 hurricane. Abby emerged into the Caribbean Sea a few hours later. As it headed generally westward, it also gradually strengthened. By July 11, Hurricane Abby had attained peak intensity as an 80 mph (130 km/h) category 1 hurricane.

The intensity of Abby began to gradually level off, though it re-intensified slightly in the Caribbean, before eventually weakening further. Abby was downgraded to a tropical storm on the morning of July 13; it was center roughly 222 mi (357 km) south of Kingston, Jamaica at the time. Just six hours thereafter, Abby had maximum sustained winds of only 45 mph (72 km/h). Abby re-intensified at a relatively quick pace, as it was near hurricane status again when it passed just to the north of Honduras on July 14.

Late on July 14, Abby had re-intensified into a hurricane. A few hours later, Abby passed over the island of Roatán at about midnight (EDT) on July 15. It made a third and final landfall on July 15 when it moved inland over British Honduras (presently known as Belize) as a minimal hurricane. Abby quickly weakened and was downgraded to a tropical storm only a few hours later over land. While Abby approached the border of Guatemala and Mexico, it had weakened further to a tropical depression. Abby dissipated while situated over the Mexican state of Tabasco on July 16. The remnants crossed over Mexico into the Pacific Ocean and regenerated into Hurricane Celeste on July 20. Hurricane Celeste lasted for two days in the Pacific before it dissipated on July 22.

== Preparations and impact ==
=== Lesser Antilles ===
There were many watches and warning issued during the passage of Hurricane Abby throughout the Caribbean. Some gale warnings were issued from the Grenadines to Guadeloupe starting on July 10. Around 1600 UTC later that day, a hurricane watch was issued for the Virgin Islands and Puerto Rico. Several hours later, the watch was extended to include Dominican Republic and Haiti. All warnings were discontinued later, after the storm passed by.

Hurricane Abby bypassed Barbados a tropical depression, which resulted in minimal effects. Maximum sustained winds on Barbados were reported at 23 mph (37 km/h), while gusts were recorded up to 37 mph (60 km/h). There are no other effects known on Barbados. St. Lucia had borne the brunt of the storm when Hurricane Abby made landfall as a category 1 hurricane. Rainfall on the island totaled at 6.80 in (173 mm). Tropical storm force winds were recorded on the island for the passage of Hurricane Abby on July 10, though there were no hurricane-force winds reported. In addition, a roof collapsed in on a house, killing six of the residents living there. The passage of Hurricane Abby also resulted in $435,000 (1960 dollars, $4.73 million in 2026) of damage on St. Lucia. Martinique was near the path of Hurricane Abby, which resulted in some effects. The Martinique Aimé Césaire International Airport in Fort-de-France recorded rainfall at nearly three inches (76 mm), while rain in another village was measured at nearly four inches (100 mm). Winds on Martinique were also at least tropical storm force during the passage of Hurricane Abby. However, wind gusts on Martinique were around 75 mph (121 km/h), greater than that which was observed on St. Lucia. There were also damaged roads and bridges, mainly due to landslides. The island nation of Dominica was also affected by Hurricane Abby. Hurricane Abby produced nearly six in (152.4 mm) of rain on the island. Winds were also similar to those that were measured on Barbados. Hurricane Abby left about $65,000 (1960 dollars, $707,000 in 2026) in damage to Dominica.

=== Greater Antilles and Central America ===
It was initially believed that Abby would affect Jamaica with gale-force winds and heavy rainfall, and the U.S. Weather Bureau noted that "interests" on the island should monitor the progress of the storm. However, Abby remained far south of the island, and the impact it had on the island, if any, is unknown. Citizens of the Cayman Islands, Central America, and the Yucatan Peninsula were also to remain on alert during the passage of Abby. The U.S. Weather Bureau later warned citizens in British Honduras and Honduras to "take all precautions for the protection of life and property against dangerous winds and abnormally high seas".

Hurricane Abby also produced 1.62 in (41 mm) of rain on Swan Island. On the islands north of Honduras, reports were received until winds reached 52 mph (84 km/h), and then communications were lost. In Belize City, which was 75 mi (121 km) north of where Abby made landfall, wind gusts were reported to 35 mph (56 km/h). Minor property damage was reported in British Honduras, totaling to BZ$6,000 (approximately $3,000 in 1960 US dollars; $33,000 in 2026). In addition, agricultural losses reached BZ$75,000 (about $37,500 1960 US dollars; $408,000 in 2026). Although Abby nearly made landfall in Honduras and eventually entered Mexico, no effects were reported, but the U.S. Weather Bureau believed that flooding and there were seas of at least 5 ft (1.5 m) above normal.

Throughout its path, Abby caused only about $600,000 (1960 dollars, $6.53 million in 2026) in damage and six fatalities.

== See also ==
- 1960 Atlantic hurricane season
- Hurricane Ernesto (2012)
- Hurricane Earl (2016)
