= 1960 Pacific hurricane season =

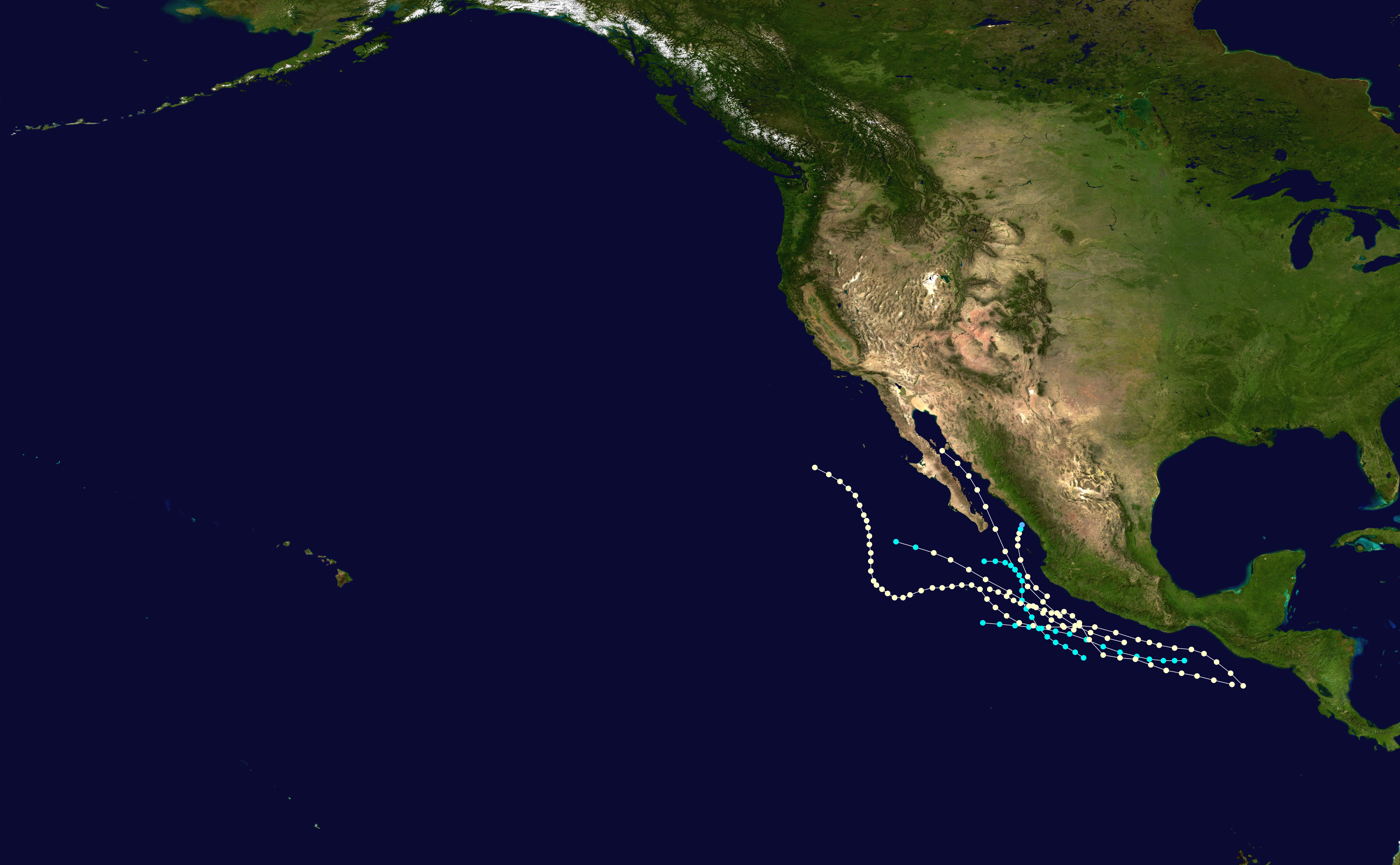
- Season summary map

Seasonal boundaries
- First system formed: June 9, 1960
- Last system dissipated: October 23, 1960

Strongest storm
- Name: Estelle
  - Maximum winds: 85 mph (140 km/h) (1-minute sustained)
  - Lowest pressure: 977 mbar (hPa; 28.85 inHg)

Seasonal statistics
- Total depressions: 8
- Total storms: 8
- Hurricanes: 6
- Major hurricanes (Cat. 3+): 0
- Total fatalities: Unknown
- Total damage: Unknown

Related articles
- 1960 Atlantic hurricane season; 1960 Pacific typhoon season; 1960 North Indian Ocean cyclone season

The 1960 Pacific hurricane season was an event in meteorology. It officially started on May 15, 1960, in the eastern Pacific and lasted until November 30, 1960. The 1960 season was the first season that Eastern Pacific hurricanes were named.

Eight tropical cyclones, seven named storms and five hurricanes formed during the 1960 season, none of the hurricanes reached beyond category 1 status on the Saffir-Simpson Hurricane Scale.

== Systems ==
=== Tropical Storm Annette ===
- Tropical storm (SSHWS)
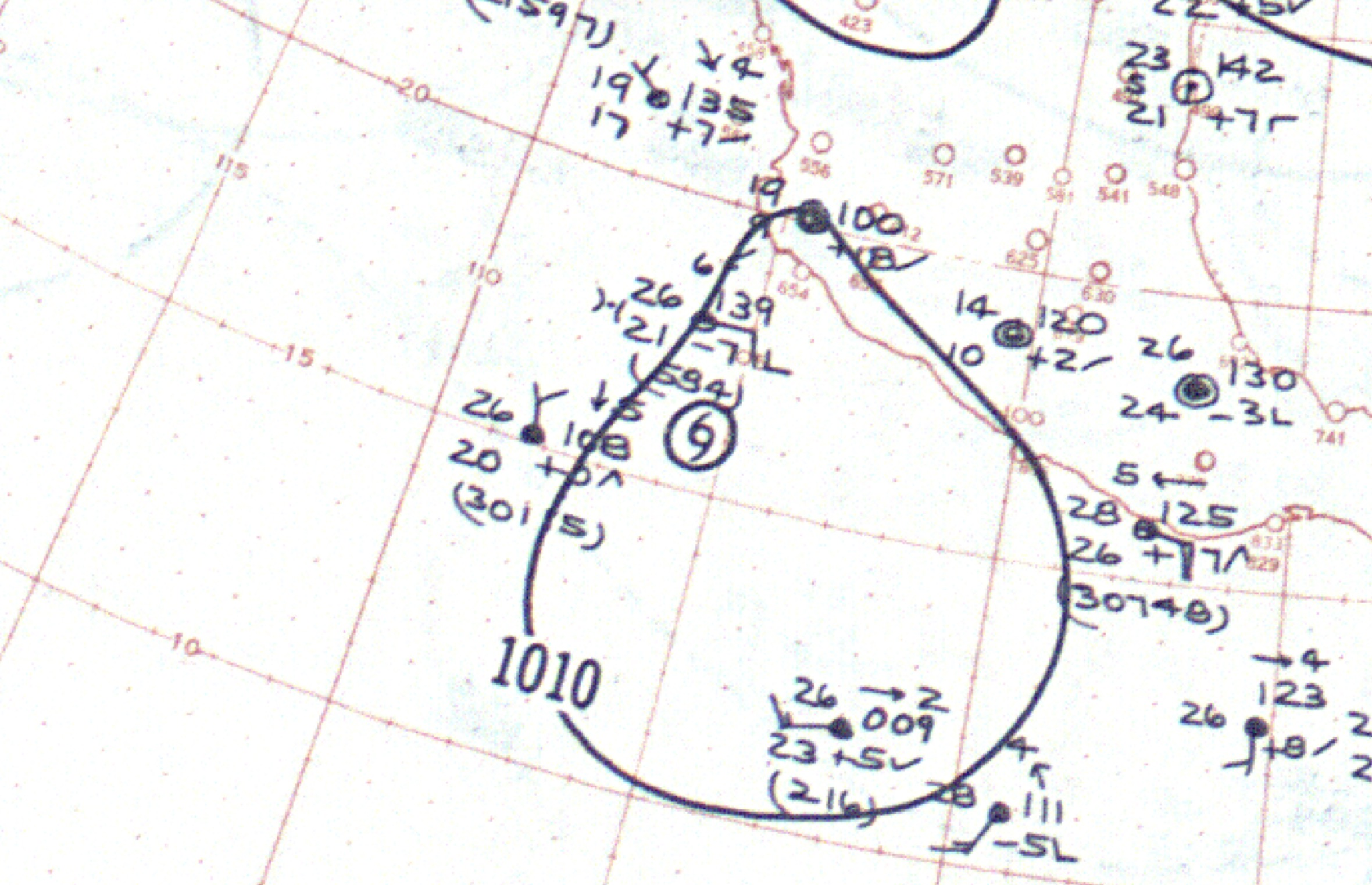
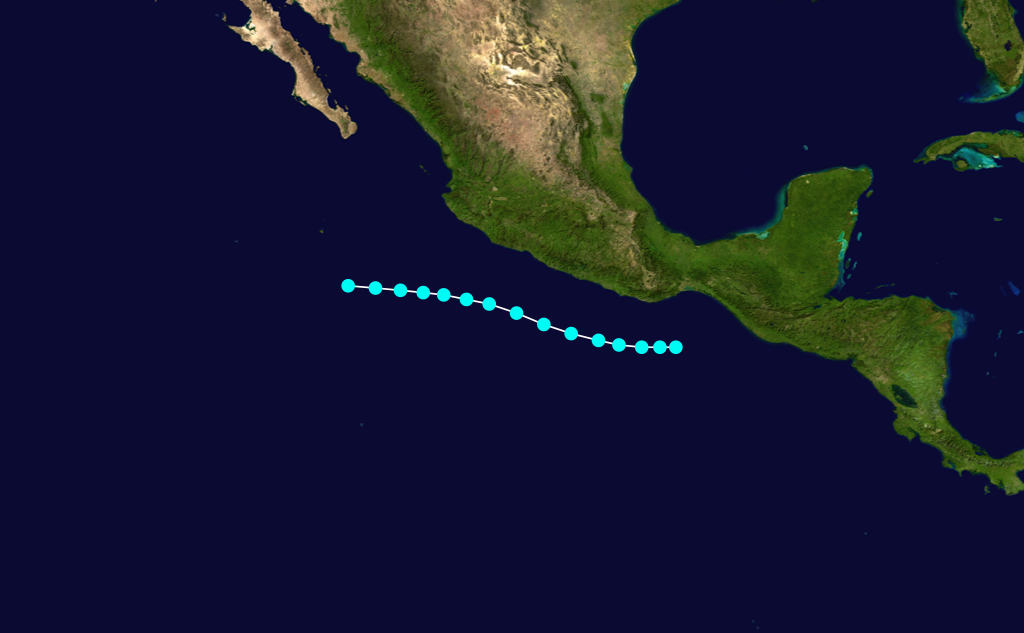
- Duration: June 9 – June 12
- Peak intensity: 50 mph (85 km/h) (1-min); 996 mbar (hPa)

Tropical Storm Annette formed on June 9 as a 45 mph (70 km/h) tropical storm south of Mexico and moved westward before dissipating on June 12. The storm never made landfall and the effects from Annette is unknown.

=== Tropical Storm Bonny ===
- Tropical storm (SSHWS)
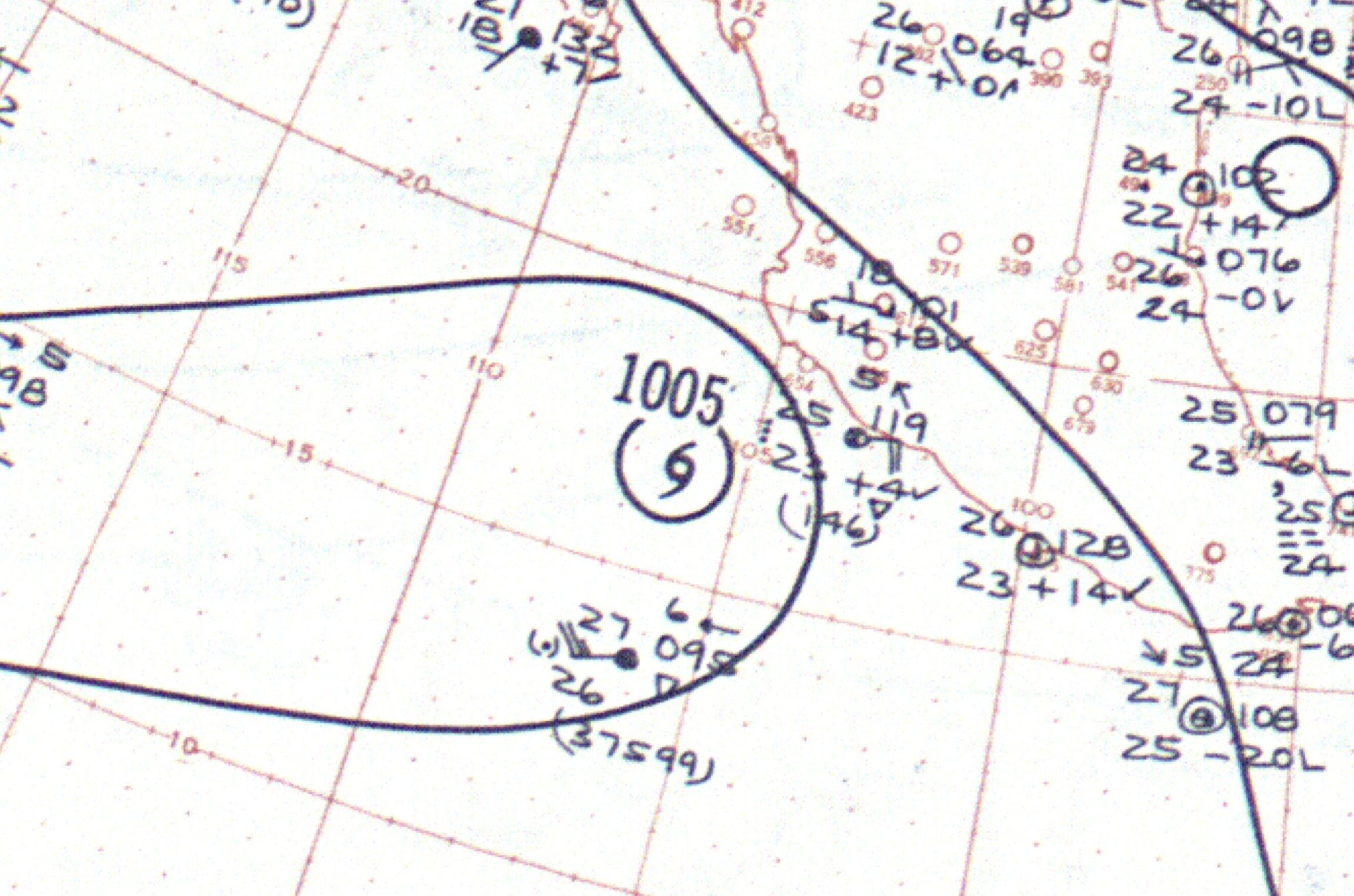
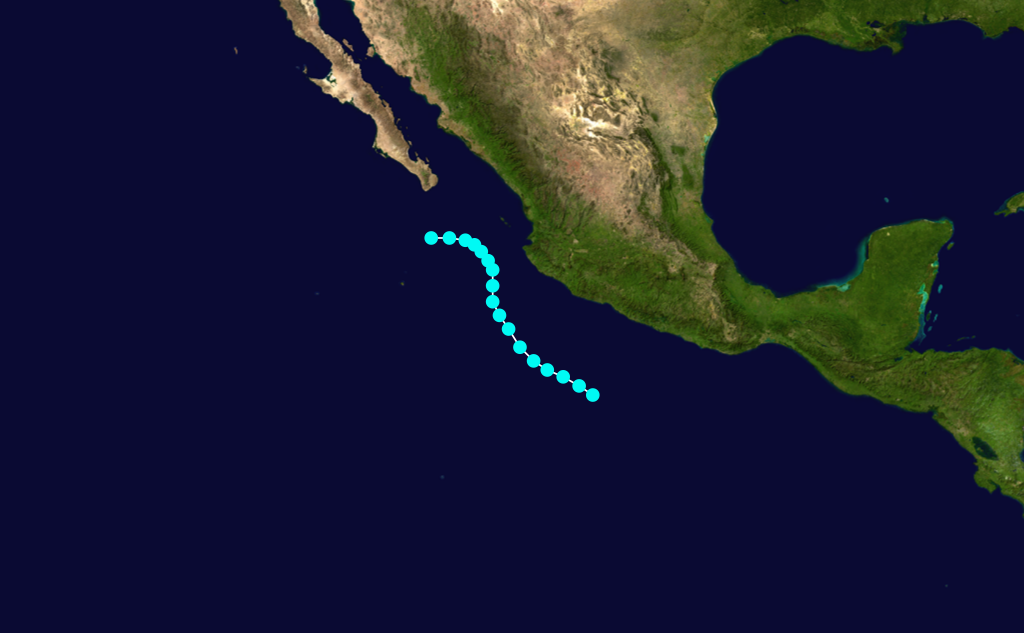
- Duration: June 22 – June 26
- Peak intensity: 50 mph (85 km/h) (1-min); 998 mbar (hPa)

Tropical Storm Bonny formed on June 22 southwest of Mexico and moved northwestward as a 45 mph (70 km/h) tropical storm. Bonny then turned northward and then turned westward before dissipating south of Baja California on June 26.

=== Hurricane Celeste ===
- Category 1 hurricane (SSHWS)
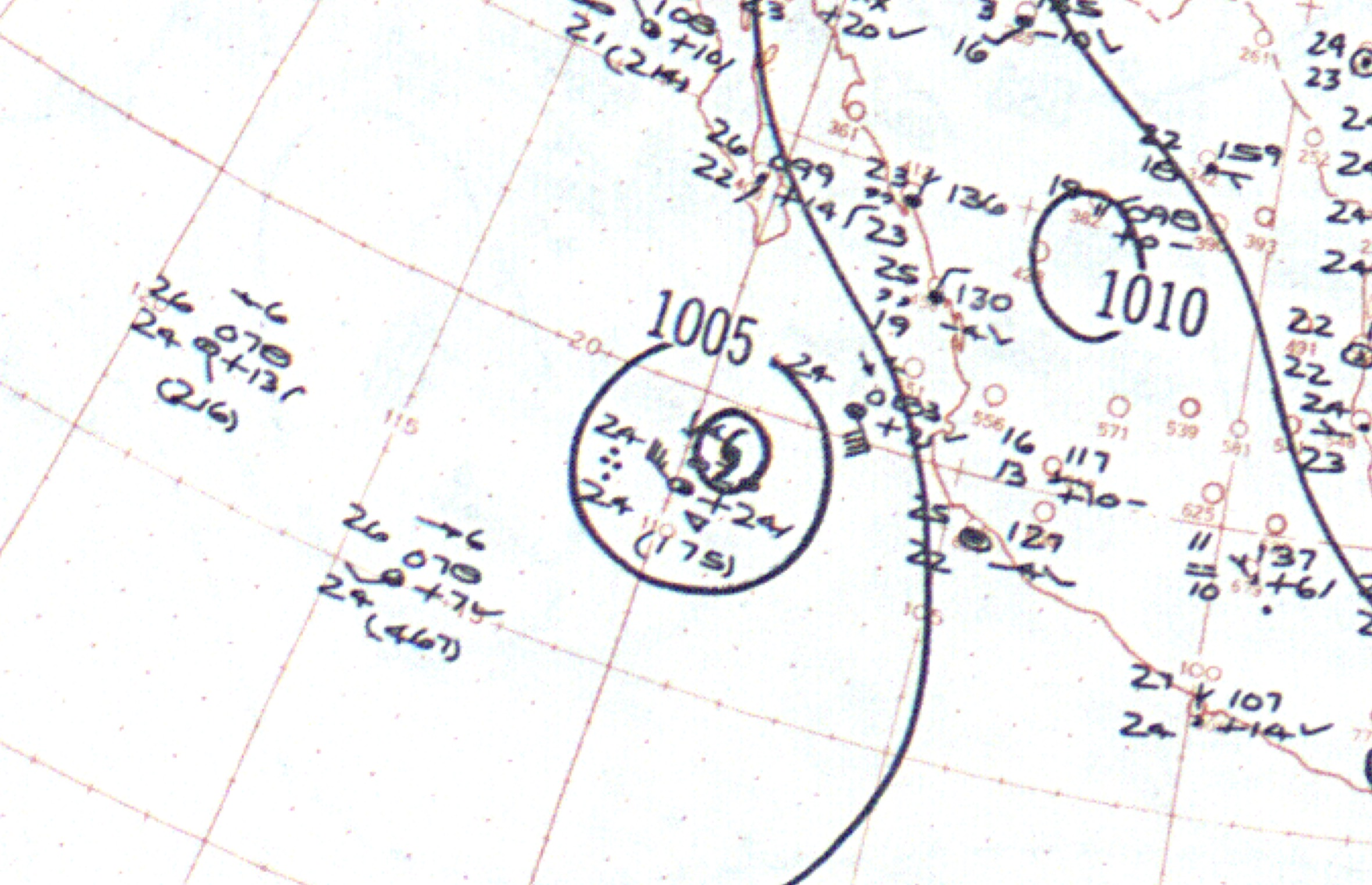
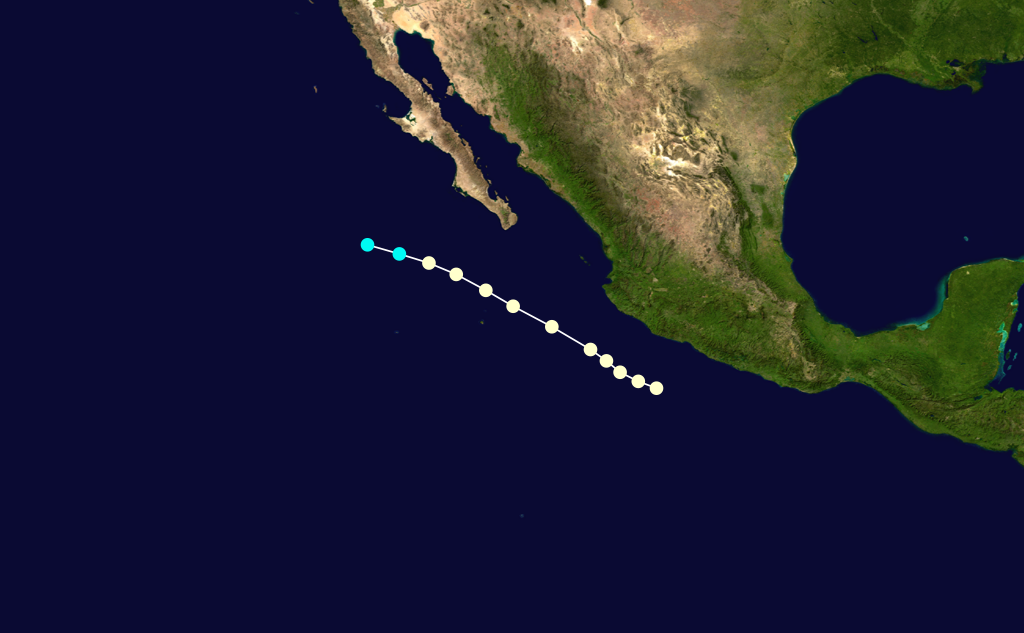
- Duration: July 20 – July 22
- Peak intensity: 85 mph (140 km/h) (1-min); 994 mbar (hPa)

The remnants of Hurricane Abby crossed over Mexico into the Pacific Ocean and regenerated into a hurricane on July 20 and was named Celeste. The hurricane moved northwestward where it winds peaked at 85 mph (135 km/h) before it weakened into a tropical storm and dissipated on July 22.

=== Hurricane Diana ===
- Category 1 hurricane (SSHWS)
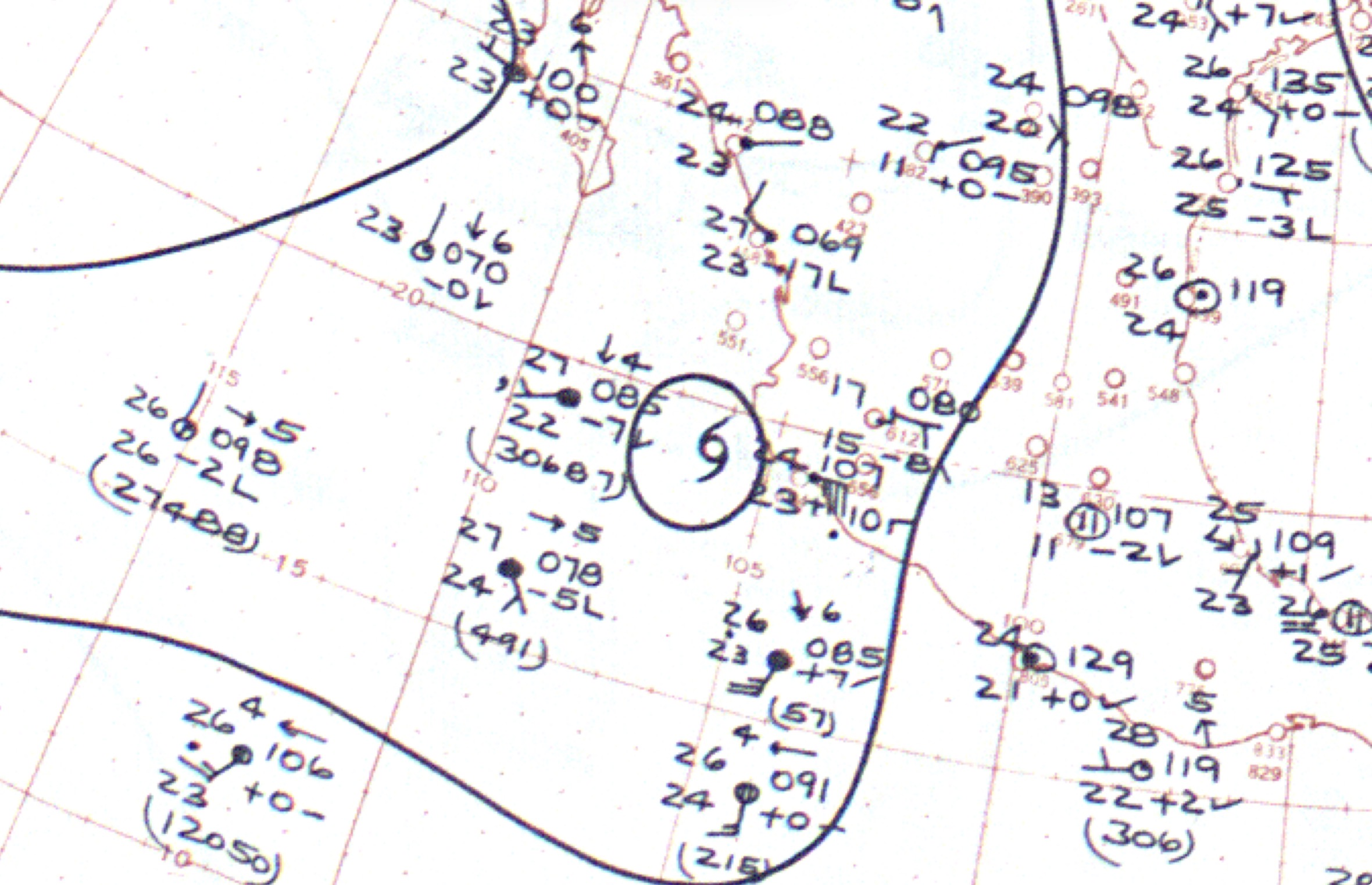
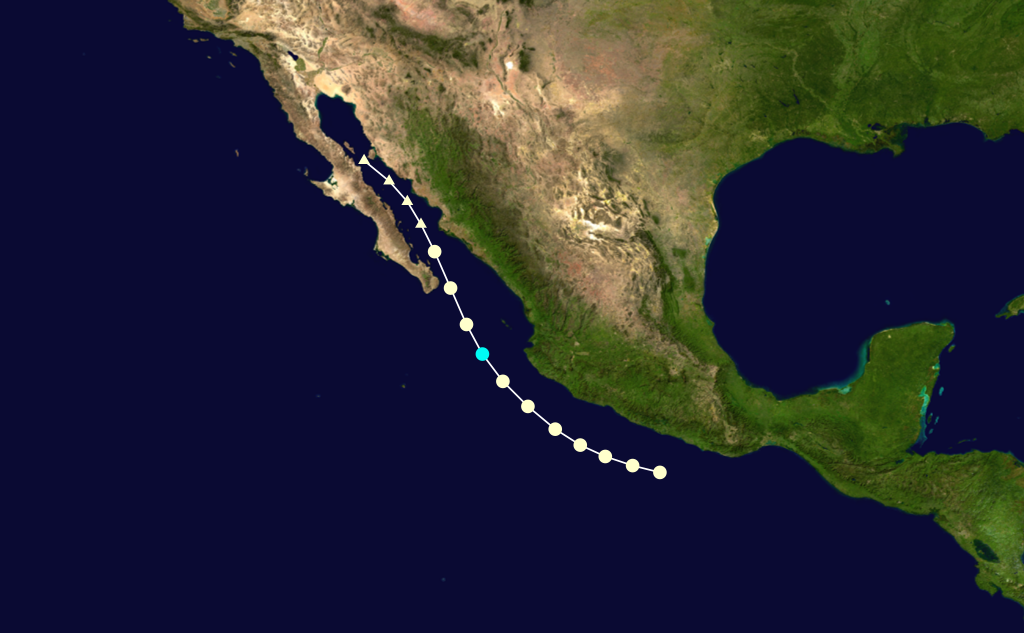
- Duration: August 17 – August 20
- Peak intensity: 90 mph (150 km/h) (1-min); 989 mbar (hPa)

Hurricane Diana formed on August 16 And reached hurricane strength on August 17 where it moved northwestward. Diana briefly weakened into a tropical storm on August 18 before reaching hurricane strength again the following day. After brushing southern Baja California Peninsula, Diana entered the Gulf of California where it became extratropical on August 20.

=== Hurricane Estelle ===
- Category 1 hurricane (SSHWS)
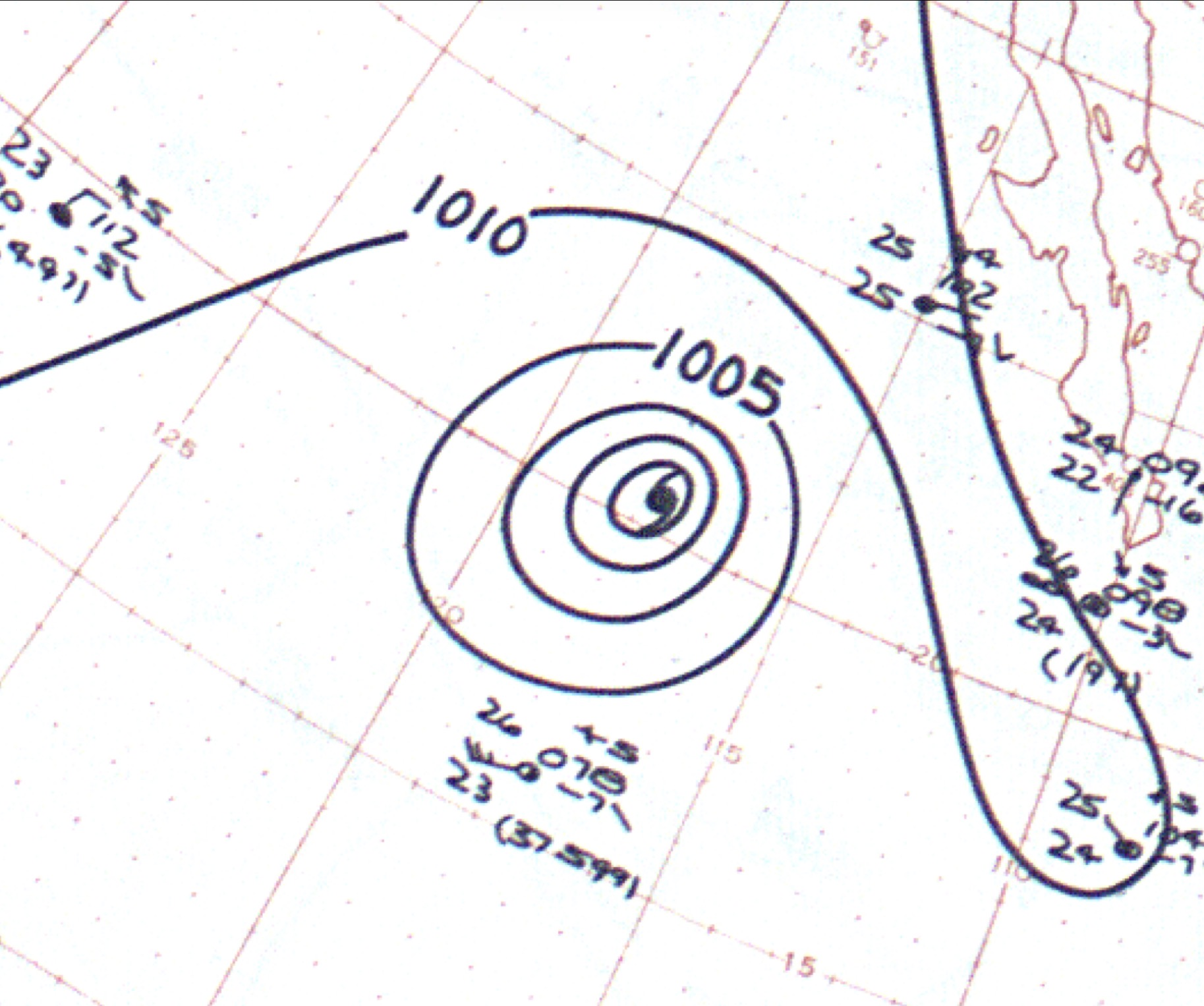
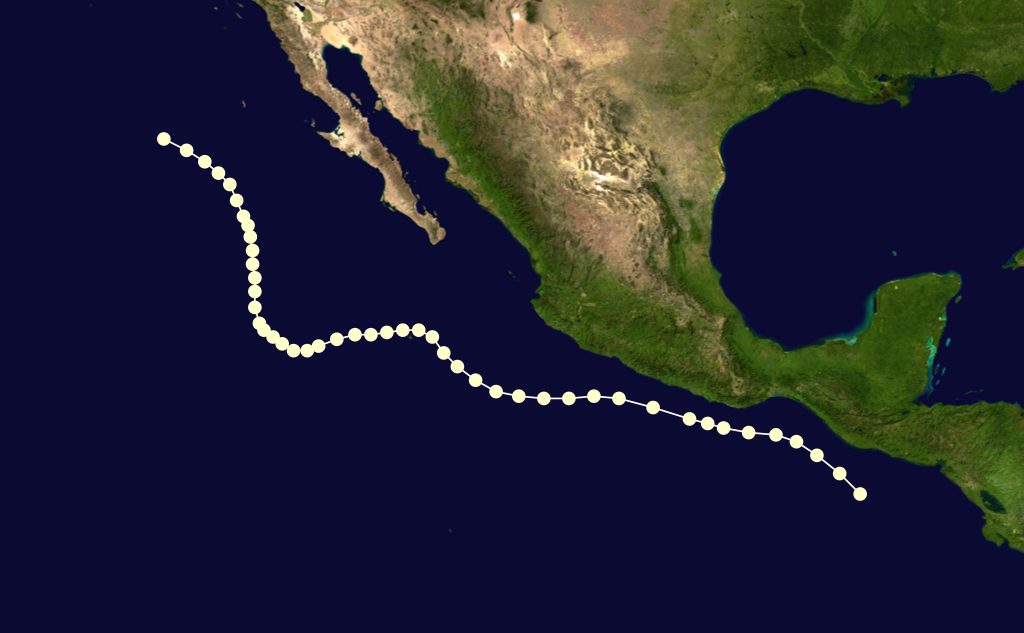
- Duration: August 29 – September 9
- Peak intensity: 85 mph (140 km/h) (1-min); 977 mbar (hPa)

Estelle formed on August 29 south-southwest of Guatemala. The storm moved west-northwest, paralleling the coast of Mexico as an 85 mph (135 km/h) hurricane before becoming extratropical on September 9. The remnants of Estelle brought heavy rainfall across southern California with rainfall totals reaching 3.1 inches (76.2 mm) in Julian.

=== Hurricane Fernanda ===
- Category 1 hurricane (SSHWS)
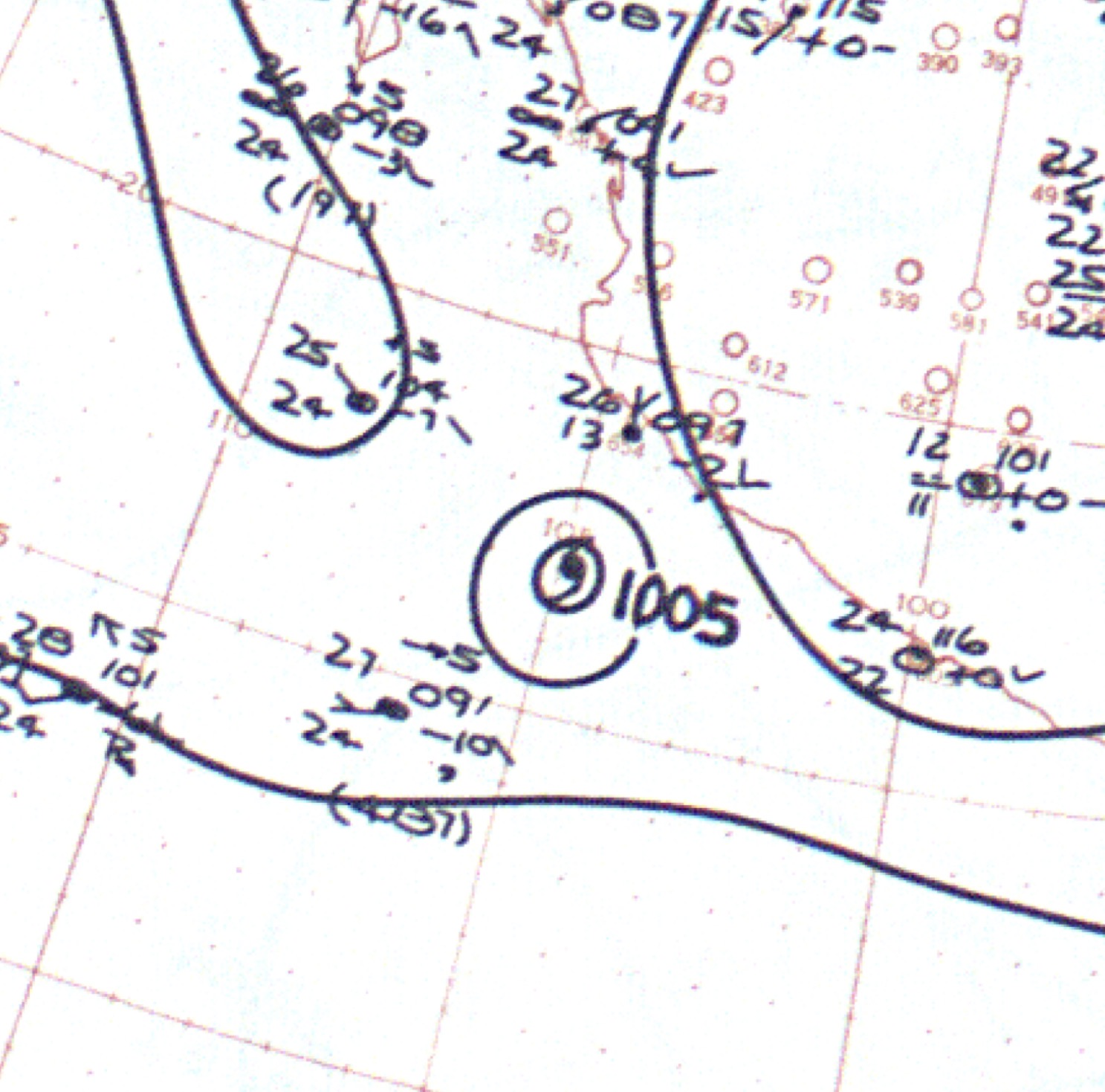
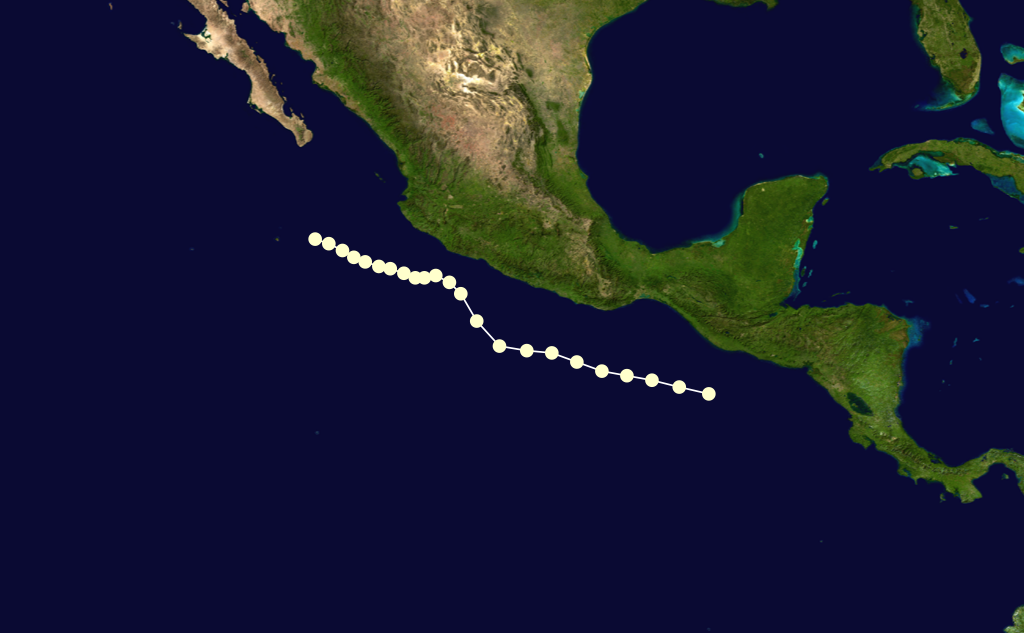
- Duration: September 3 – September 8
- Peak intensity: 85 mph (140 km/h) (1-min); 999 mbar (hPa)

Fernanda formed on September 3 southwest of Guatemala where it moved west-northwest as a category 1 hurricane before dissipating on September 8 southwest of Mexico.

=== Hurricane Gwen ===
- Category 1 hurricane (SSHWS)
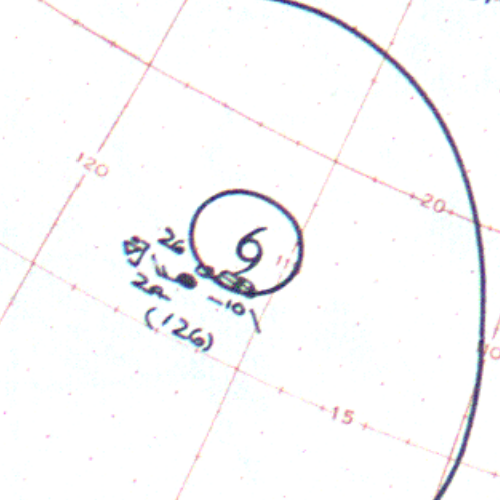
- Duration: October 4 – October 5
- Peak intensity: 85 mph (140 km/h) (1-min); 1000 mbar (hPa)

Only one report of Gwen was submitted to the National Weather Bureau by the vessel Lord Lodrington early on October 4. The system was given the name Gwen and an Air Force reconnaissance aircraft sent to monitor the system. However, by the time they reached the area where the hurricane was positioned, found the storm had completely dissipated. Due to the lack of reports no track data was produced for Gwen.

=== Hurricane Hyacinth ===
- Category 1 hurricane (SSHWS)
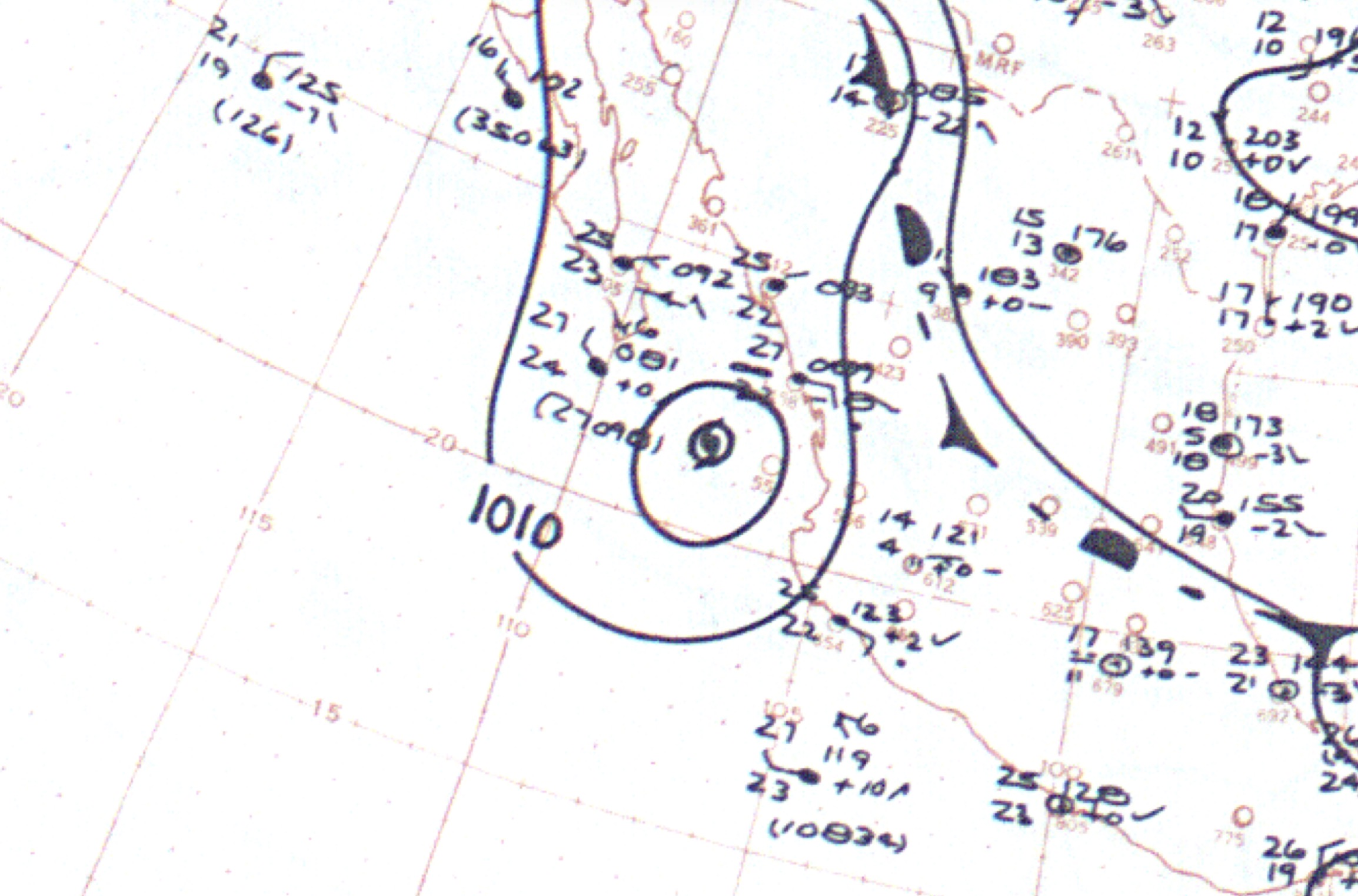
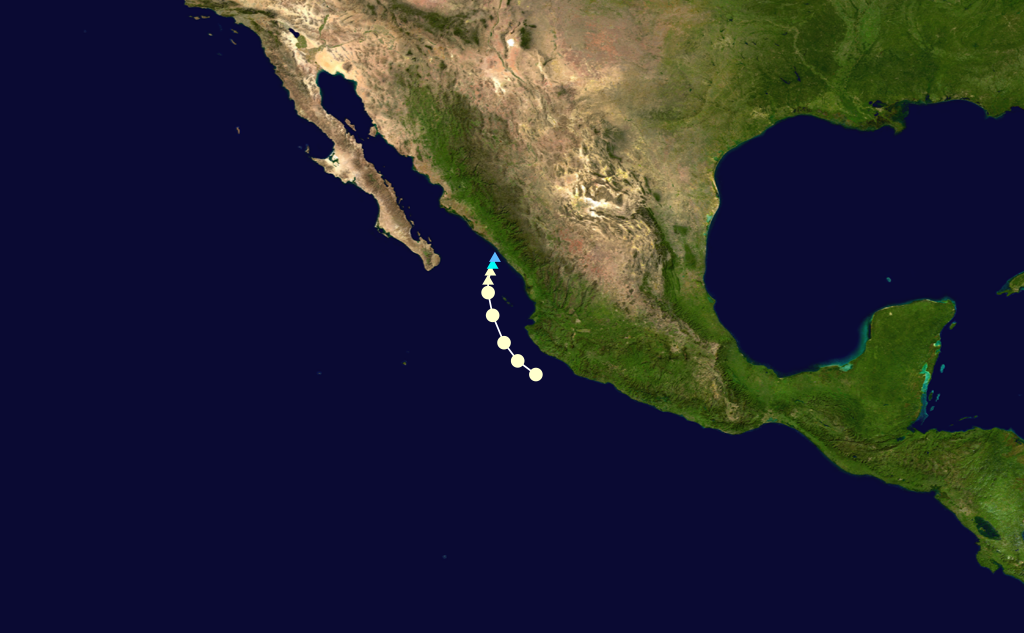
- Duration: October 21 – October 23
- Peak intensity: 85 mph (140 km/h) (1-min); 989 mbar (hPa)

Hyacinth formed as a hurricane on October 21 and recurved northeastward where it made weakened into a tropical storm before it made landfall as a tropical depression on October 23. Damage from Hyacinth, if any, is unknown.

== Storm names ==
The following names were used for tropical storms that formed in the North Pacific Ocean east of 140°W during 1960. The names came from a series of four rotating lists. Names were used one after the other without regard to year, and when the bottom of one list was reached, the next named storm received the name at the top of the next list. This was the first season in which tropical storms in the basin were officially given names.

- Annette
- Bonny
- Celeste
- Diana
- Estelle
- Fernanda
- Gwen
- Hyacinth

No tropical storms formed in the North Pacific between 140°W and the International Date Line in 1960. Had there been, their names would have been drawn from the Western Pacific typhoon naming list.

== See also ==
- Tropical cyclone
- List of Pacific hurricanes
- 1960 Atlantic hurricane season
- 1960 Pacific typhoon season
- 1960 North Indian Ocean cyclone season
- Australian region cyclone seasons: 1959–60 1960–61
- South Pacific cyclone seasons: 1959–60 1960–61
- South-West Indian Ocean cyclone seasons: 1959–60 1960–61
