= Deccan Peninsula =

Peninsula in India

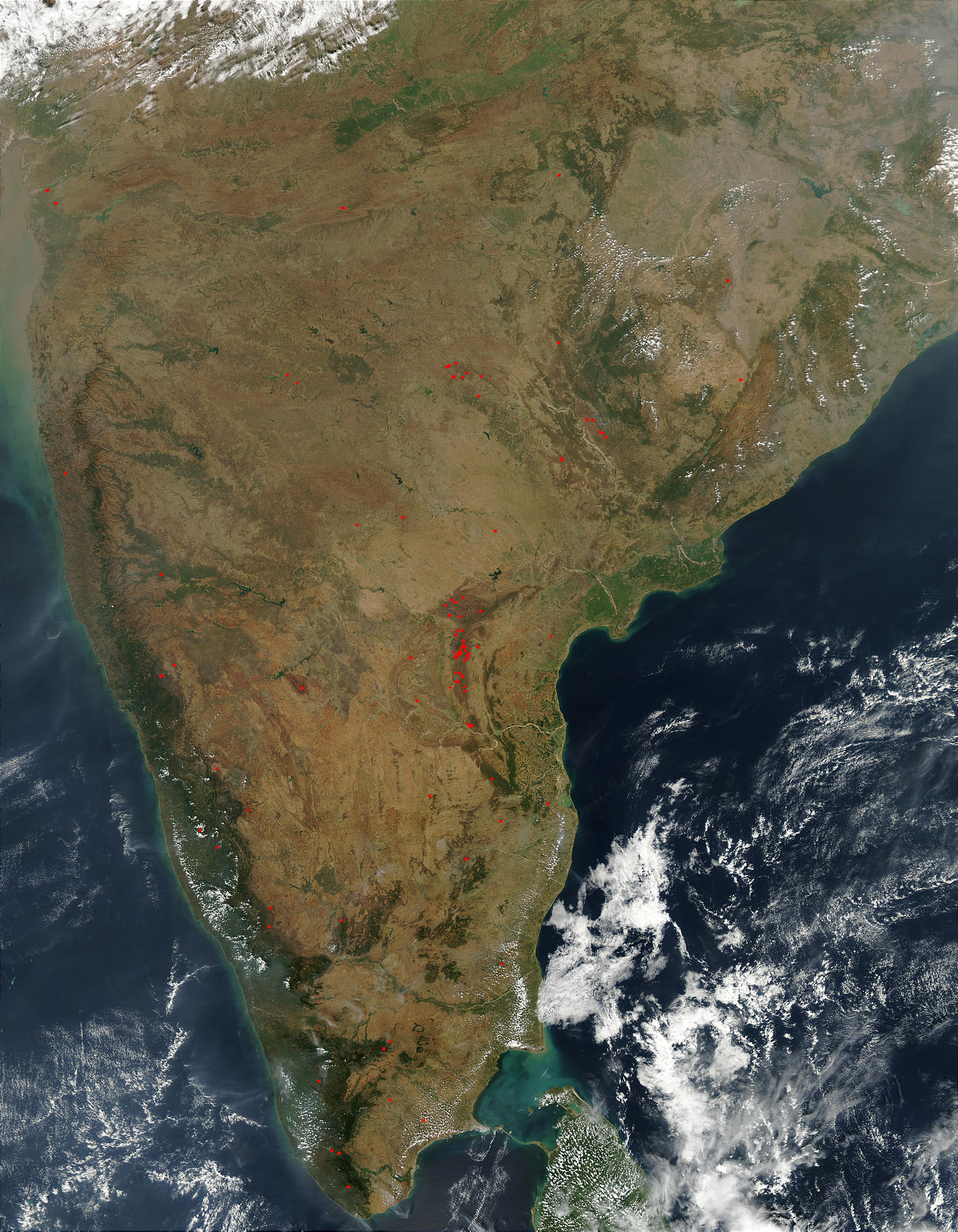

Geography
- Coordinates: 15°N 77°E
- Area: 1,900,000 km^{2} (730,000 sq mi)

Administration
- India
- States: Andhra Pradesh; Chhattisgarh; Goa; Gujarat; Karnataka; Kerala; Madhya Pradesh; Maharashtra; Odisha; Puducherry; Tamil Nadu; Telangana

The Deccan Peninsula (/ˈdɛkən/ DEK-ən) is a peninsula that extends over an area of 1,900,000 km^{2} (730,000 sq mi) and is one of the four distinct geographical sub-regions of India. It forms the southern part of the Indian subcontinent. The Deccan Plateau forms the bulk of the peninsula, and is contiguous with the Central Highlands, which forms the northern part of the peninsula. It is bound by the Eastern and Western Coastal Plains on the sides. It stretches from the Aravalli range in the northwest and from the southern end of the Indo-Gangetic Plain to the Indian Ocean in the south, while stretching from Bay of Bengal in the east to Arabian Sea in the west. The mountain ranges of the Eastern Ghats and the Western Ghats separate the plateau region from the eastern and western coastal plains respectively.
