= Rajakesari Peruvazhi =

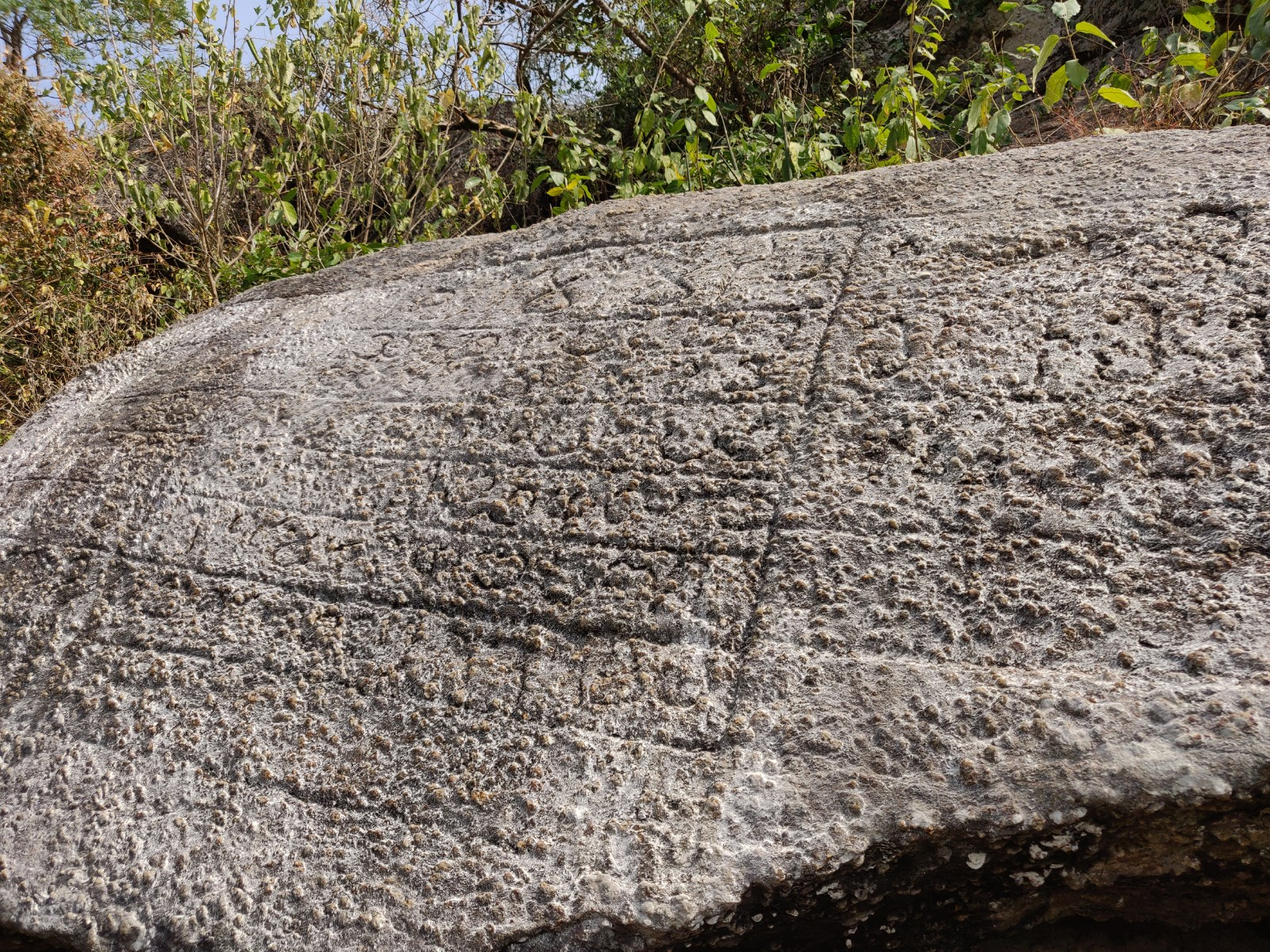
Tamil inscription mentioning the repair of the highway by the Chola ruler Aditya I (Aiyyasamy Hills, Coimbatore).

Rajakesari Peruvazhi (lit. 'Highway of the Lion King (Note: Rajakesari, meaning "lion king" or "lion among kings" in Tamil, was a title used by various Chola rulers.)') was an early historic and medieval highway that traversed the present-day states of Tamil Nadu and Kerala in southern India. In the historic Tamilakam (the Tamil country), the highway connected the regions of western Chera Nadu (Kerala) and Kongu Nadu (western Tamil Nadu), which were separated by the Western Ghats. The highway passed through the Palghat Gap in the Western Ghats and also through Perur, Vellalur, and Sulur. It formed part of a route linking the port of Muchiri (Muziris) in the western coast (the Malabar Coast) of southern India with Arikamedu on the eastern coast, and was part of an extended trade network connecting the Mediterranean/Middle East and Southeast Asia/East Asia.

Tamil (Tamil Script and Vattezhuthu) inscriptions found near Coimbatore (the Aiyyasamy Hills) indicate that the highway was used by the medieval Cholas in the 9th and 10th centuries CE. The inscriptions further state that the highway was strengthened or repaired by the Chola ruler Aditya I in the 10th century CE. According to an inscription on a memorial stone (the Thukkachi memorial stone), Rajendra Chola I travelled along this road to reach the Chera country from the Chola Nadu.

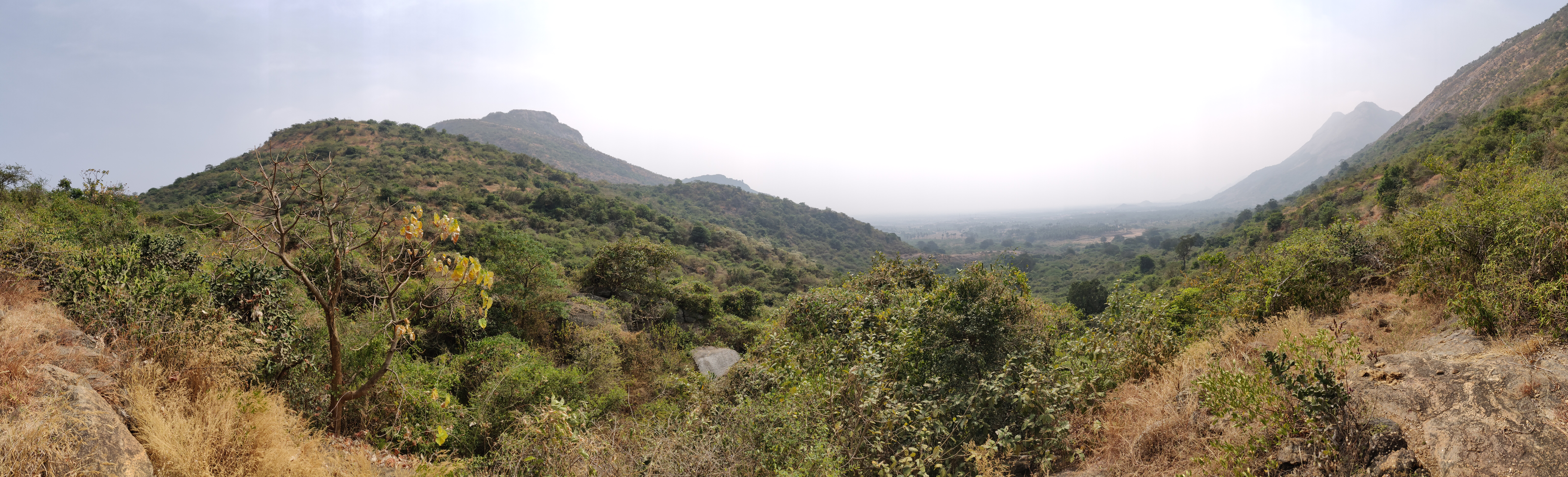
Rajakesari Peruvazhi (Aiyyasamy Hills, Coimbatore)
