= Palakkad Gap =

Mountain pass in South India

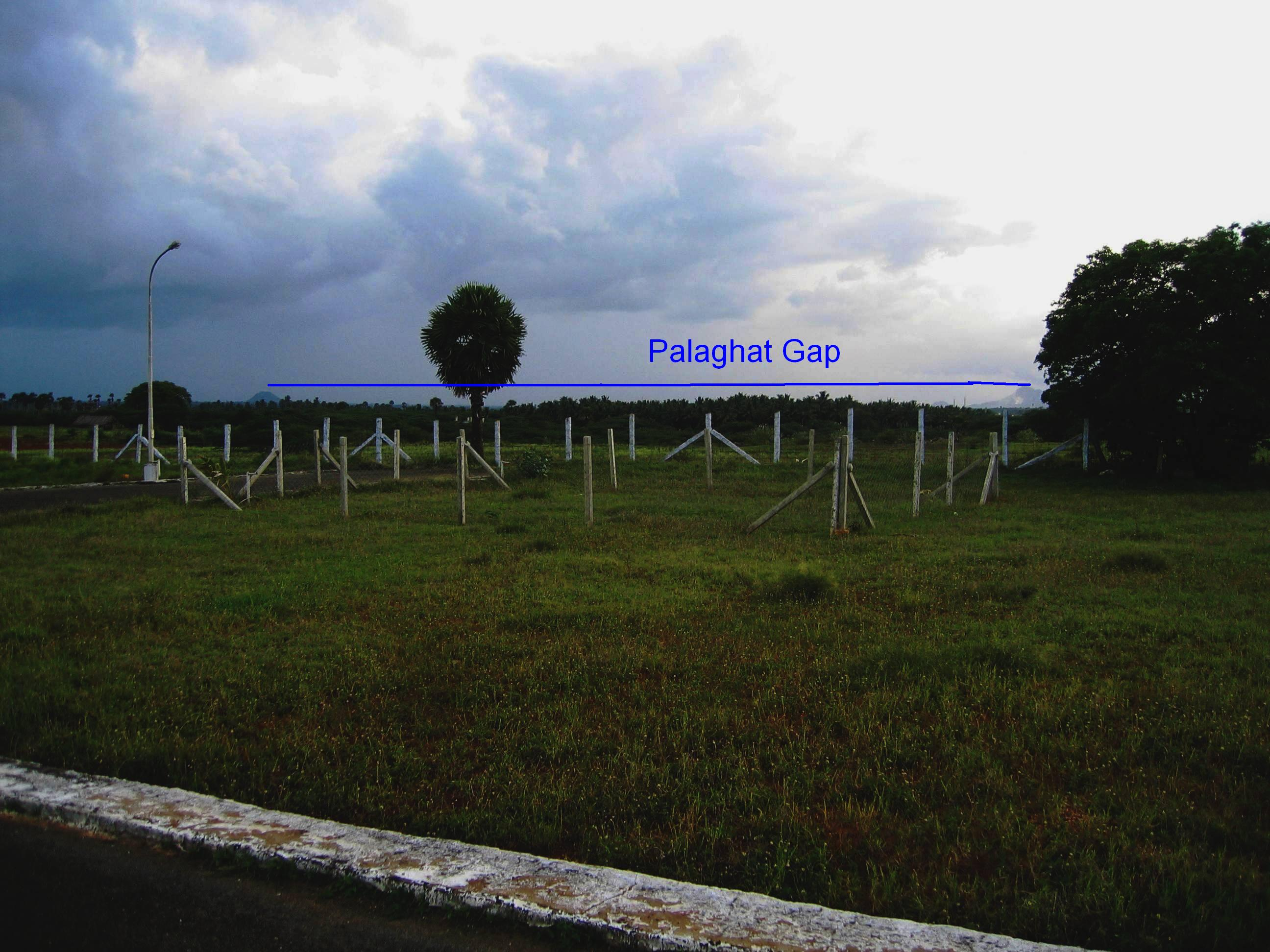
- Palakkad Gap

- Location within Kerala Location within Tamil Nadu

Third Approach
- Location: Tamil Nadu–Kerala, India
- Range: Western Ghats
- Coordinates: 10.718550°N 76.881966°E

Palakkad Gap or Palghat Gap is a low mountain pass in the Western Ghats between Coimbatore and Palakkad located in the Indian states of Tamil Nadu and Kerala respectively. It is located between the Nilgiri Hills to the north and Anaimalai Hills to the south.

== History ==
Chera Nadu and Kongu Nadu were territorial divisions in the ancient Tamilakam, which were separated by the Western Ghats. An ancient highway called Rajakesari Peruvazhi connected the regions via the Palakkad Gap, and was part of an extended trade that extended from Muziris in the western coast to Arikamedu on the eastern coast of the Indian subcontinent. The local chieftains of the Kongu region made marriage alliances with the Cheras, which resulted in a migration of significant population between the regions via the Palakkad Gap. Between first and fourth centuries CE, the Chera country consisted of most of the present day Kerala and western Tamil Nadu, and the gap enabled them to rule the territory from their capital at Karuvur The Tamil Brahmins migrated to Palakkad from central Tamil Nadu via the gap between the 15th to 18th centuries CE.

== Geography and formation ==
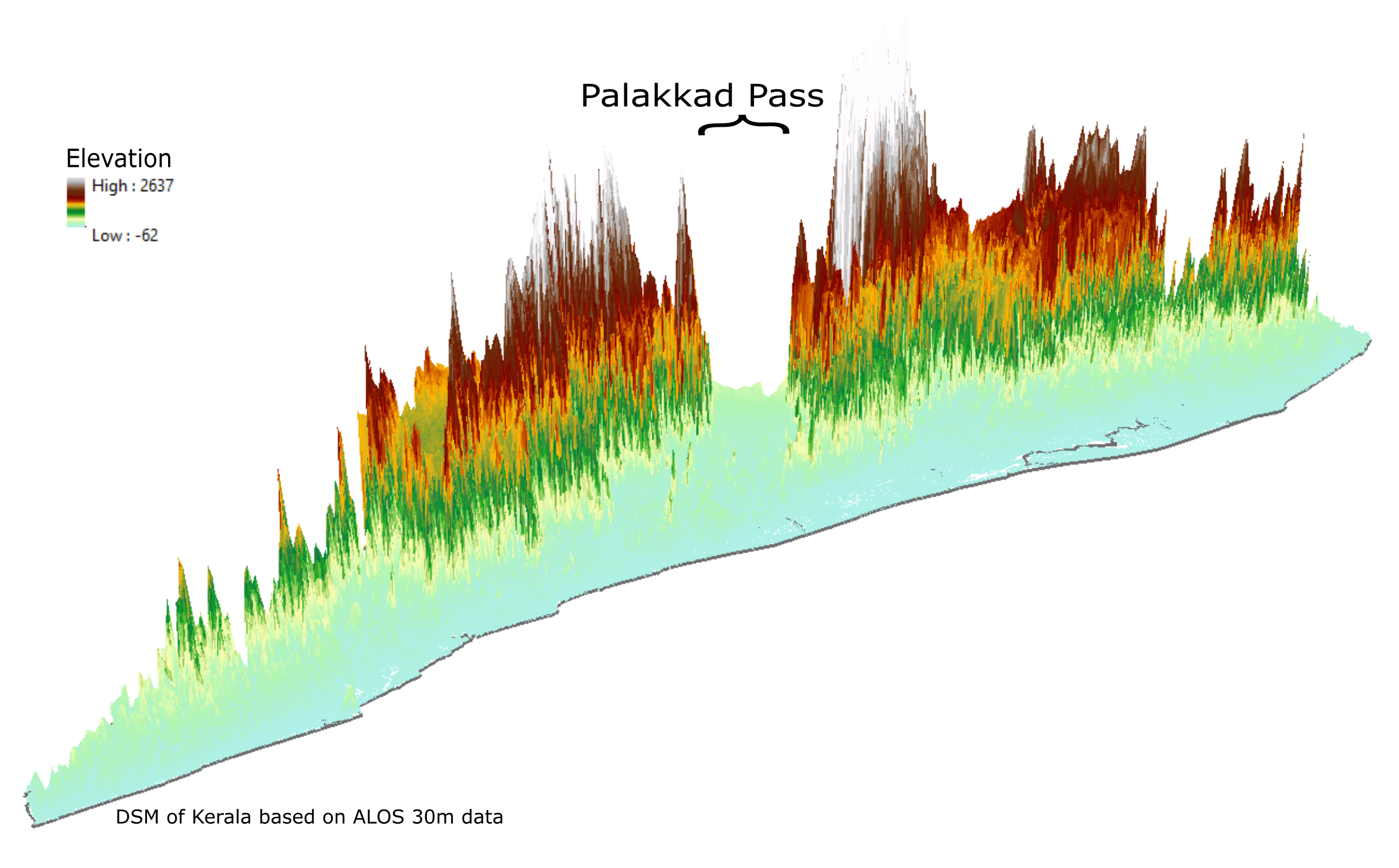
Digital elevation model of the Western Ghats showing the Palakkad gap

The Palakkad Gap is a 32 km (20 mi) wide gap in the Western Ghats between the Nilgiri Hills to the north and Anaimalai Hills to the south. The pass connects the Indian states of Tamil Nadu and Kerala.

A 2008 study suggested that the gap is the continuation of a Precambrian shear zone that extended from East Africa through the Ranotsara gap of Madagascar to the Palakkad gap in India. As per a 2019 study, the gap may have been created by a meteor strike around 800 to 550 million years ago which led to the flattening of the hilly terrain in the area and the formation of the gap. As per another theory, it formed due to a landslide that occurred caused by the Bharathappuzha river that currently flows through the gap. The river is fed by various rivulets and tributaries flowing from steep escarpment slopes along the flanks of the Ghats.

== Climate ==
The Palakkad Gap affects the weather patterns in South India. During the southwest monsoon, the Western Ghats blocks the moist air that flows eastwards from the Arabian Sea, resulting in a rain shadow region with very little rainfall on the leeward side towards most of the interior of the Deccan Plateau. However, the gap lets the moisture laden winds into western Tamil Nadu, moderating late summer temperatures and generating a higher rainfall in the region relative to the rest of the region. It also allows the hot winds coming from Tamil Nadu which warm the eastern part of Kerala significantly compared to the rest of the state and tropical cyclones from the Bay of Bengal to enter Kerala during the summer. The gap also experiences higher wind speeds with an average annual wind speed of 18–22 km/h (11–14 mph), and makes the region one of the major wind power generation areas.

== Transport ==
The gap acts as an important transport corridor between the linking Palakkad District of Kerala with Coimbatore District of Tamil Nadu. The National Highway 544, and the Jolarpettai-Shoranur and Palakkad–Pollachi railway lines pass through the gap.
