= Somayanur =

- Village Skyline
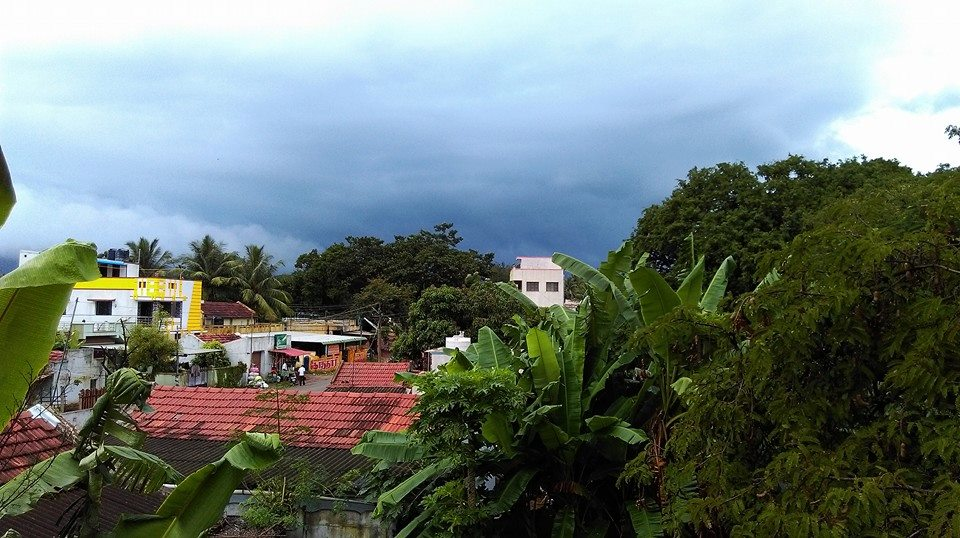

- Location in Tamil Nadu, India Somayanur (India)
- Coordinates: 11.069723°N 76.882185°E
- Country: India
- State: Tamil Nadu
- District: Coimbatore

Population (2011)
  - Total: 2,500 (Approximately)

Languages
  - Official: Tamil
- Time zone: UTC+5:30 (IST)
- PIN: 641108
- Telephone code: +91-422
- Vehicle registration: TN 38
- Literacy: 76% (Approximately)%
- Lok Sabha constituency: Nilgiris
- Vidhan Sabha constituency: Kavundapalayam(Since 2011) Thondamuthur
- Climate: Cool during winter and hot during summer (Köppen)
- Website: http://somayanur.blogspot.com/

Somayanur village is part of 22 Nanjundapuram Panchayat (Village Panchayat) located in Coimbatore, Tamil Nadu, India.

Residents are engaged in agriculture, especially the cultivation of vegetables and coconuts. The brick business is the primary source of income around Chinnathadagam ("Brick city of Coimbatore") and surrounding areas. There are more than 1000 brick factories in this area.

== Geography ==
Somayanur is a part of 22 Nanjundapuram Panchayat (Village Panchayat) located near Chinnathadagam. The Western Ghats surrounds this village. It is close to the Kerala border and enjoys a pleasant climate throughout the year. More than 1000 families live in this village.

== Climate ==
Somayanur has a mild climate due to its proximity to thickly forested mountain ranges and the cool breeze blowing through the Palghat gap during the monsoon seasons. The village has mild winters and moderate summers. The mean maximum and minimum temperatures during summer and winter vary between 35 °C and 18 °C.

The presence of the mountain pass benefits many parts of the Coimbatore district from the southwest monsoon from June to August. After a warm, humid September, the regular monsoon starts from October and lasts till early November. These monsoons are brought by the retreating North-Eastern monsoon. The average annual rainfall is around 700 mm with the northeast and the southwest monsoons contributing 47% and 28% respectively to the total rain.

== Educational institutions ==
=== Government schools ===
- Panchayat Union middle school, Somayanur, Chinnathadagam (Via), Coimbatore

=== Private schools ===
- St. Joseph Girls High School, Somayanur, Krishnapuram Road, Bharathiyar Nagar, Ganesh Puram (est. 1962)
- Sri Kamatchiamman Matriculation Higher Secondary School, Somayanur-Sadapalayam Rd, Bharathiyar Nagar, Krishna Puram

== Religion ==
Approximately there are ten temples in this village.

== Festivals ==
- Mariamman Temple festival
- Pongal festival

Pongal is one of the major festivals in South India, which is celebrated well in Somayanur. On Pongal day, the people of Somayanoor celebrate Pongal with lots of love and enjoyment. People used to conduct sports on the day of Pongal, which has a history of more than 30 years. These sports are conducted to encourage the children as well as the youngsters of Somayanur. The participants for this sports event come from nearby villages. Kabadi is one of the chief sports which has a bunch of fans.
