= Peninsula =

Landform extending from a mainland

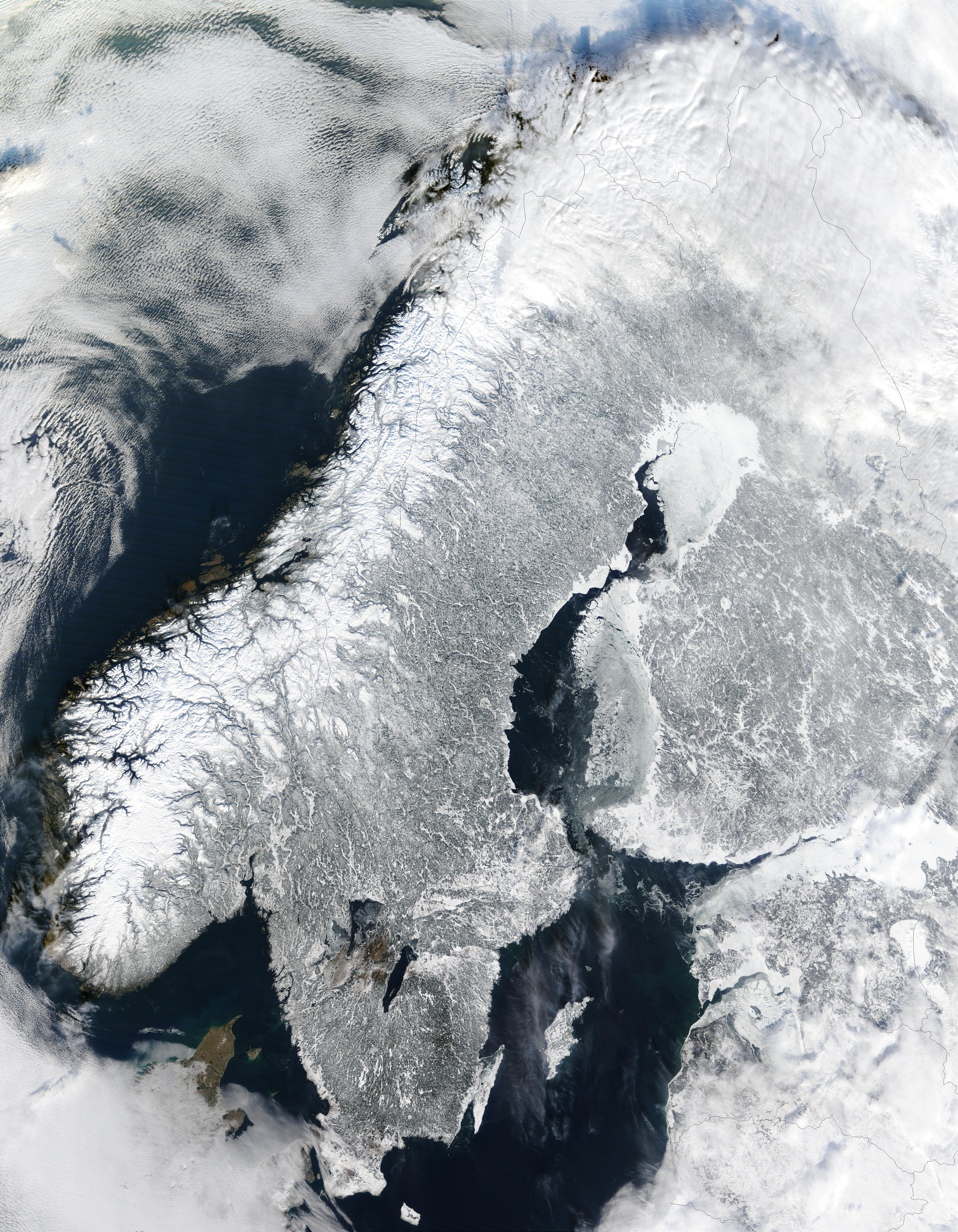
The Scandinavian Peninsula during winter

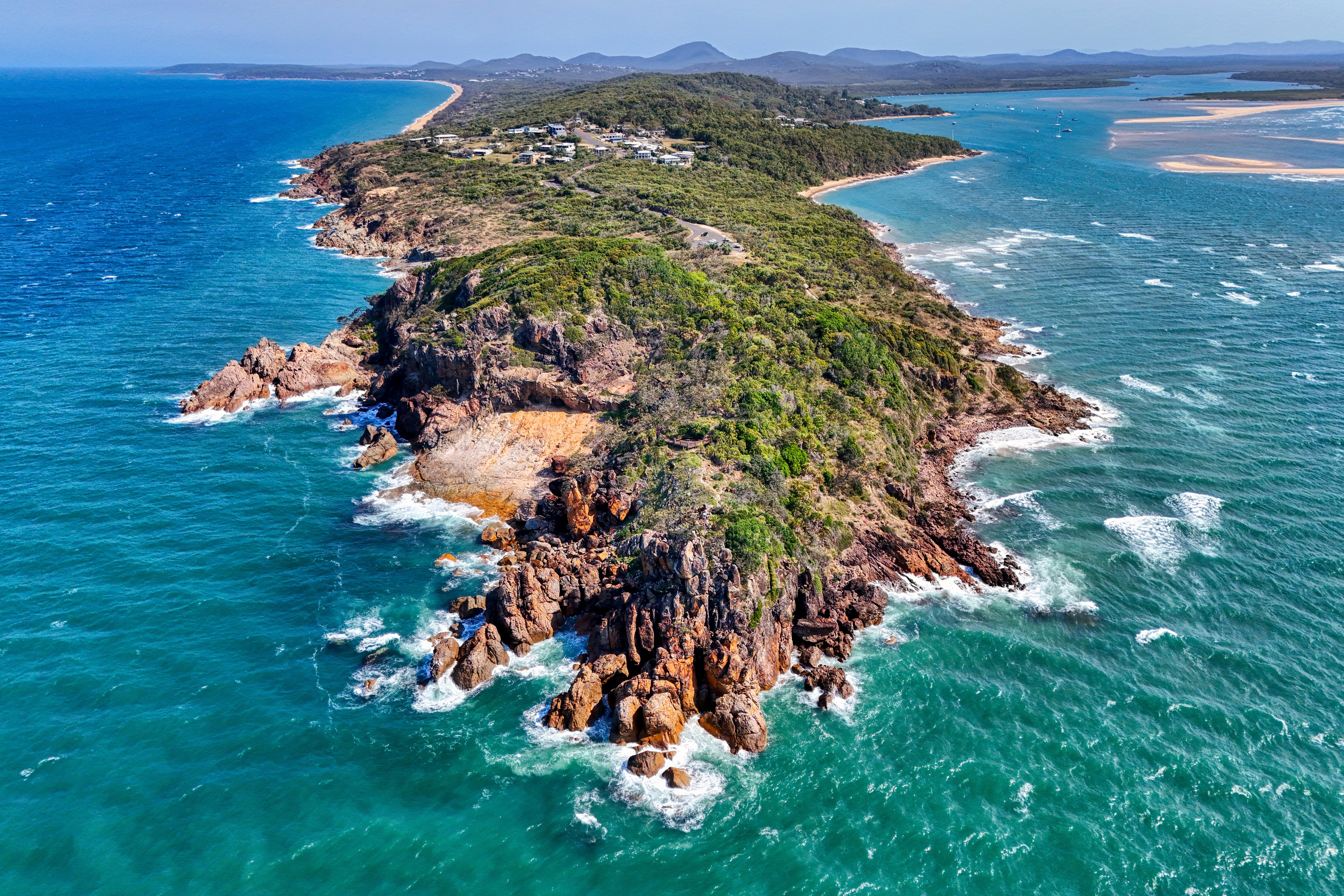
The peninsula of Seventeen Seventy, Queensland, where Captain Cook landed in 1770

A peninsula is a landform that extends from a mainland, is connected to the mainland on only one side, and is mostly surrounded by water. Peninsulas exist on each continent. The largest peninsula in the world is the Arabian Peninsula.

== Etymology ==
The word peninsula derives from Latin paeninsula, from paene 'almost' and insula 'island'. The word entered English in the 16th century.

== Definitions ==
A peninsula is generally defined as a piece of land surrounded on most sides by water.

A peninsula may be bordered by more than one body of water, and the body of water need not be an ocean or a sea. A piece of land on a very tight river bend, or one between two rivers, is sometimes said to form a peninsula, for example in the New Barbadoes Neck in New Jersey, United States. The connection between a peninsula and the mainland may be an isthmus; for example, the Isthmus of Corinth connects the Peloponnese peninsula to Central Greece.

== Formation and types ==
Peninsulas can be formed by continental drift, glacial erosion, glacial meltwater, glacial deposition, marine sediment, marine transgressions, volcanoes, divergent boundaries or river sedimentation. More than one factor may contribute to the formation of a peninsula. For example, in the case of Florida, continental drift, marine sediment, and marine transgressions all contributed to its shape.

=== Glaciers ===
In the case of formation from glaciers (for example, the Antarctic Peninsula or Cape Cod), peninsulas can be created due to glacial erosion, meltwater or deposition. If erosion formed the peninsula, softer and harder rocks were present, and since the glacier only erodes softer rock, it formed a basin. This may create peninsulas, and occurred for example in the Keweenaw Peninsula.

In the case of formation from meltwater, melting glaciers deposit sediment and form moraines, which act as dams for the meltwater. This may create bodies of water that surround the land, forming peninsulas.

If deposition formed the peninsula, the peninsula was composed of sedimentary rock, which was created from a large deposit of glacial drift. The hill of drift becomes a peninsula if the hill formed near water but was still connected to the mainland, for example during the formation of Cape Cod about 23,000 years ago.

=== Others ===
In the case of formation from volcanoes, when a volcano erupts magma near water, it may form a peninsula (such as the Alaskan Peninsula). Peninsulas formed from volcanoes are especially common when the volcano erupts near shallow water. Marine sediment may form peninsulas by the creation of limestone. A rift peninsula may form as a result of a divergent boundary in plate tectonics (such as the Arabian Peninsula), while a convergent boundary may also form peninsulas (for example, Gibraltar or the Indian subcontinent). Peninsulas can also form due to sedimentation in rivers. When a river carrying sediment flows into an ocean, the sediment is deposited, forming a delta peninsula.

Marine transgressions (changes in sea level) may form peninsulas, but may also affect existing peninsulas. For example, the water level may change, which causes a peninsula to become an island during high water levels. Similarly, wet weather causing higher water levels make peninsulas appear smaller, while dry weather make them appear larger. Sea level rise from global warming will permanently reduce the size of some peninsulas over time.

== Uses ==
Peninsulas are noted for having acted as shelters for prehistoric humans and Neanderthals. The landform is advantageous because it gives hunting access to both land and sea animals. They can also serve as markers of a nation's borders. In history, peninsulas have played a vital role in trade and commerce because of their access to water through an isthmus. The Malay Peninsula, located at the convergence of the Indian Ocean and the China Seas, played an important role in east-west trade.

== List of the largest peninsulas in the world ==
| Rank | Peninsula | Continent | Subregion | Part of | Area | | Nation(s) | Source |
| Rank | Peninsula | Continent | Subregion | Part of | (km^{2}) | (sq mi) | Nation(s) | Source |
|---|---|---|---|---|---|---|---|---|
| 1 | Arabian Peninsula | Asia | West Asia | Arabia | 3,100,000 | 1,200,000 | Iraq (southern region); Jordan (southern region); Kuwait; Oman; Qatar; Saudi Arabia; United Arab Emirates; Yemen | |
| 2 | Indochinese Peninsula | Asia | Southeast Asia | Mainland Southeast Asia | 2,000,000 | 770,000 | Cambodia; Laos; Malaysia (western region); Myanmar; Thailand; Vietnam | |
| 3 | Deccan Peninsula | Asia | South Asia | Indian Subcontinent | 1,900,000 | 800,000 | India (southern region) | |
| 4 | Somali Peninsula | Africa | East Africa | Horn of Africa | 1,882,757 | 726,936 | Ethiopia; Somalia; Somaliland | |
| 5 | Labrador Peninsula | North America | Northern America | – | 1,400,000 | 540,000 | Canada (eastern region) | |
| 6 | Anatolian Peninsula | Asia | West Asia | Asia Minor | 755,688 | 291,773 | Turkey (Asian part) | |
| 7 | Scandinavian Peninsula | Europe | Northern Europe | Fennoscandia | 750,000 | 290,000 | Finland (northern region); Norway; Sweden | |
| 8 | Balkan Peninsula | Europe | Southern Europe | South-eastern Europe | 666,700 | 257,400 | Albania; Bosnia and Herzegovina; Bulgaria; Croatia (southern mainland); Greece (mainland); Kosovo; Montenegro; North Macedonia; Romania (coastal region); Serbia (central region); Slovenia (south-western region); Turkey (European part) | |
| 9 | Iberian Peninsula | Europe | Southern Europe | South-western Europe | 583,256 | 225,196 | Andorra; France (French Cerdagne); Gibraltar (United Kingdom); Portugal (mainland); Spain (mainland) | |
| 10 | Antarctic Peninsula | Antarctica | West Antarctica | – | 522,000 | 202,000 | – | |
| 11 | Taymyr Peninsula | Asia | North Asia | North Siberian Lowland | 400,000 | 150,000 | Russia (Krasnoyarsk Krai) | |
| 12 | Kamchatka Peninsula | Asia | North Asia | Russian Far East | 370,000 | 140,000 | Russia (Kamchatka Krai) | |

== See also ==
- Barrier island
- Cape
- Headland
- Promontory
- Salient
- Spit
- Tidal island
