= Utkal Plains =

Part of the Eastern Coastal Plains in India

Coordinates: 20.645634°N 86.460711°E

The Utkal Plain is part of the Eastern Coastal Plain of India. It is a coastal plain in the Odisha state of eastern India. It includes the delta of the Mahanadi River, Brahmani River, Baitarani River. The most prominent physiographic feature of this plain is the Chilka Lake. It is the largest brackish water lagoon with estuarine character that sprawls along the east coast of Indian sub-continent in Asia and largest in the country. Its area varies between 780 km^{2} in winter to 1,144 km^{2} in the monsoon months.

Extending over about 16,000 square miles (41,000 square kilometres), the plains are bounded by the Lower Ganges (Ganga) Plain to the north, the Bay of Bengal to the east, the Andhra Plains to the south, and the Eastern Ghats to the west. The Utkal Plains are coastal lowlands consisting chiefly of Mahanadi delta deposits and marine sediments, and they merge with the Eastern Ghats at an elevation of about 250 feet (76 metres). The plains have a nearly straight shoreline.

Paleogene and Neogene alluvium (from about 65 to 2.6 million years ago) with patches of ancient Archean gneiss and sandstone (from about 4 billion to 2.5 billion years ago), the plains are widest in the deltaic regions. Sand dunes of decomposed granites and zircon, created mainly by the action of wind at low tide, and lagoons are found along the Bay of Bengal. Chilka, the largest brackish water lagoon in the region (in the southwest), is salty; Samang and Sur (north and northeast of Puri, respectively) are freshwater lakes. Littoral forests are found along the coast of the Cuttack and Balasore areas, and tropical moist deciduous forests are found inland throughout the regions near Puri and Cuttack. The Mahanadi, Brahmani, Baitarani, and Subarnarekha rivers are often subject to heavy flooding; the combined outflow of these rivers has formed the Mahanadi delta in the northern part of the plains. The region has fertile red and black soils.
