= Deccan Plateau =

Plateau in India

Deccan Plateau Peninsular Plateau
- Plateau
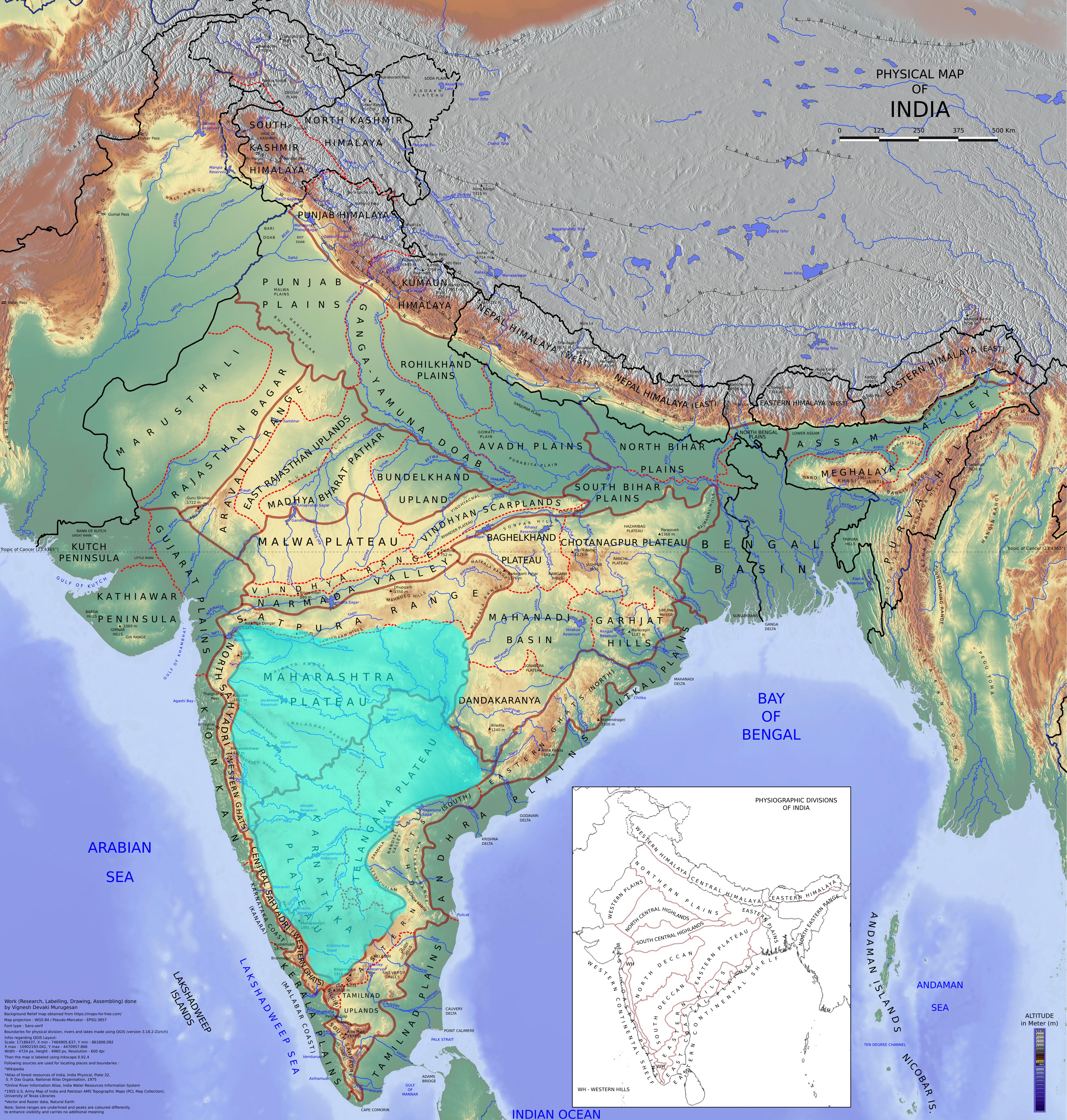
- The Deccan Plateau (cyan) forms a major part of Deccan Peninsula
- Coordinates: 15°N 77°E
- Country: India
- States: Mostly (from north to south): Maharashtra; Telangana; Karnataka; Andhra Pradesh; Partially: Madhya Pradesh; Chhattisgarh; Kerala; Tamil Nadu

Area
  - Total: 422,000 km^{2} (163,000 sq mi)

The Deccan Plateau, Deccan (/ˈdɛkən/ DEK-ən), or Peninsular Plateau, is a plateau that extends over an area of 422,000 km^{2} (163,000 sq mi) in the western, central, and southern regions of India. The plateau forms the bulk of the Deccan Peninsula, and stretches from the Satpura and Vindhya ranges in the north to the northern fringes of the Nilgiri Hills in the south. It is bound by the Eastern and the Western Ghats mountain ranges on the sides, which separate the region from the Eastern and Western Coastal Plains, respectively. From north to south, the plateau covers most of the western state of Maharashtra and southern states of Telangana, Karnataka, and Andhra Pradesh, excluding their coastal regions, and includes minor portions of the central states of Madhya Pradesh and Chhattisgarh as well as the southern states of Kerala and Tamil Nadu.

The plateau is marked by rocky terrain with an average elevation of about 600 m (2,000 ft). It is subdivided into Maharashtra Plateau, Karnataka Plateau, and Rayalaseema and Telangana Plateau. The Deccan Traps in the northwest were formed by multiple layers of igneous rock deposited by basaltic lava flows following a massive volcanic eruption occurred at the end of the Cretaceous period (66 mya). The underlying bed consists of granite and sedimentary rocks formed during the Precambrian era and the formation of Gondwana.

The region forms one of the major watersheds of India, with many perennial river systems such as Godavari, Krishna, and Kaveri flowing through the region. The plateau slopes gently from the west to east, resulting in most of the principal rivers flowing eastwards towards the Bay of Bengal. As the Western Ghats block the rain bearing winds, the plateau region is drier than the coastal region and has a semi-arid climate.

The Deccan Plateau region was ruled by several kingdoms in Indian history such as Pallavas, Cholas, Pandyas, Satavahanas, Chalukyas, Rashtrakutas, Hoysalas, Kadambas, Kakatiyas, and Western Gangas. In the later medieval era, the lower plateau was ruled by the Vijayanagara Empire, and the upper portion by the Bahmani Kingdom, and its successors, the Deccan sultanates. It later housed the Kingdom of Mysore, Maratha Confederacy, and Nizam's dominions. It was under the control of British Raj for nearly two centuries before Indian independence in 1947. The reorganisation of Indian states in the 1950s resulted in the creation of states on linguistic lines.

== Etymology ==
The word Deccan is an anglicised version of the Prakrit word dakkhaṇa, which evolved from the Sanskrit word dakṣiṇa, meaning "south".

== History ==
Carbon dating shows that ash mounds associated with Neolithic cultures in region date back to 8000 BCE. Towards the beginning of 1000 BCE, iron technology spread through the region, though geological evidence does not point to a fully developed Bronze Age in existence prior to the Iron Age. Since at least 1st century BCE, the region has been connected to the Silk Road and was involved in trade with the Mediterranean and East Asia.

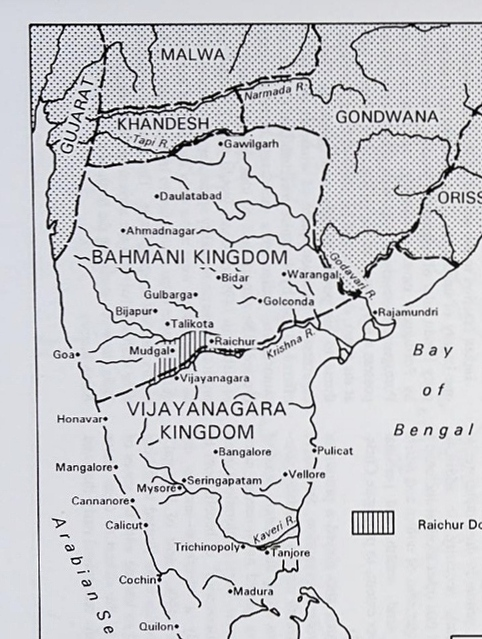
Map of Deccan in the 14th century CE

Several dynasties such as the Pandyas of Madurai, the Cholas of Thanjavur, the Zamorins of Kozhikode, the Satavahanas of Amaravati, the Pallavas of Kanchi, the Kadambas of Banavasi, the Western Gangas of Kolar, the Rashtrakutas of Manyakheta, the Chalukyas of Badami, the Hoysalas of Belur, and the Kakatiyas of Orugallu ruled over the region from the 6th century BCE to the 14th century CE. In the Late Middle Ages, Vijayanagara Empire conquered most of the southern part of the pleateu region. The upper portion was ruled by the Bahmani kingdom, and later by its successors, the Deccan sultanates.

The Europeans arrived in the 15th century CE and by the middle of the 18th century, the French and the British were involved in a protracted struggle for military control over the region. The Maratha Empire founded by Chatrapati Shivaji, briefly captured the region in the early 18th century CE. After the defeat of Mysore Kingdom in the late 18th century CE and the Vellore Mutiny in 1806 CE, the British East India Company consolidated their power over much of the region. The British Empire took control of the region from the British East India Company in 1857.

During the British colonial rule, the region was divided between the Madras Presidency, Bombay Presidency, Hyderabad State, and Mysore. The region played a major role in the Indian independence movement. After Indian Independence in 1947, majority of the region was organised into four states Bombay State, Hyderabad State, Madras State, and Mysore State. The Reorganisation of Indian states on linguistic lines in the 1950s resulted in the creation of the states of Andhra Pradesh, Karnataka, Kerala, Maharashtra, and Tamil Nadu. Telangana was created in 2014 by bifurcating Andhra Pradesh.

== Geology ==
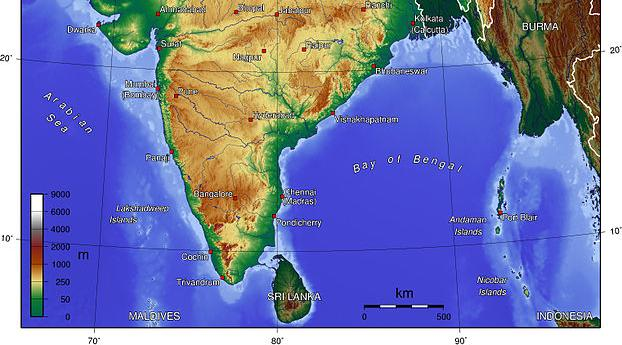
Topography of the region.

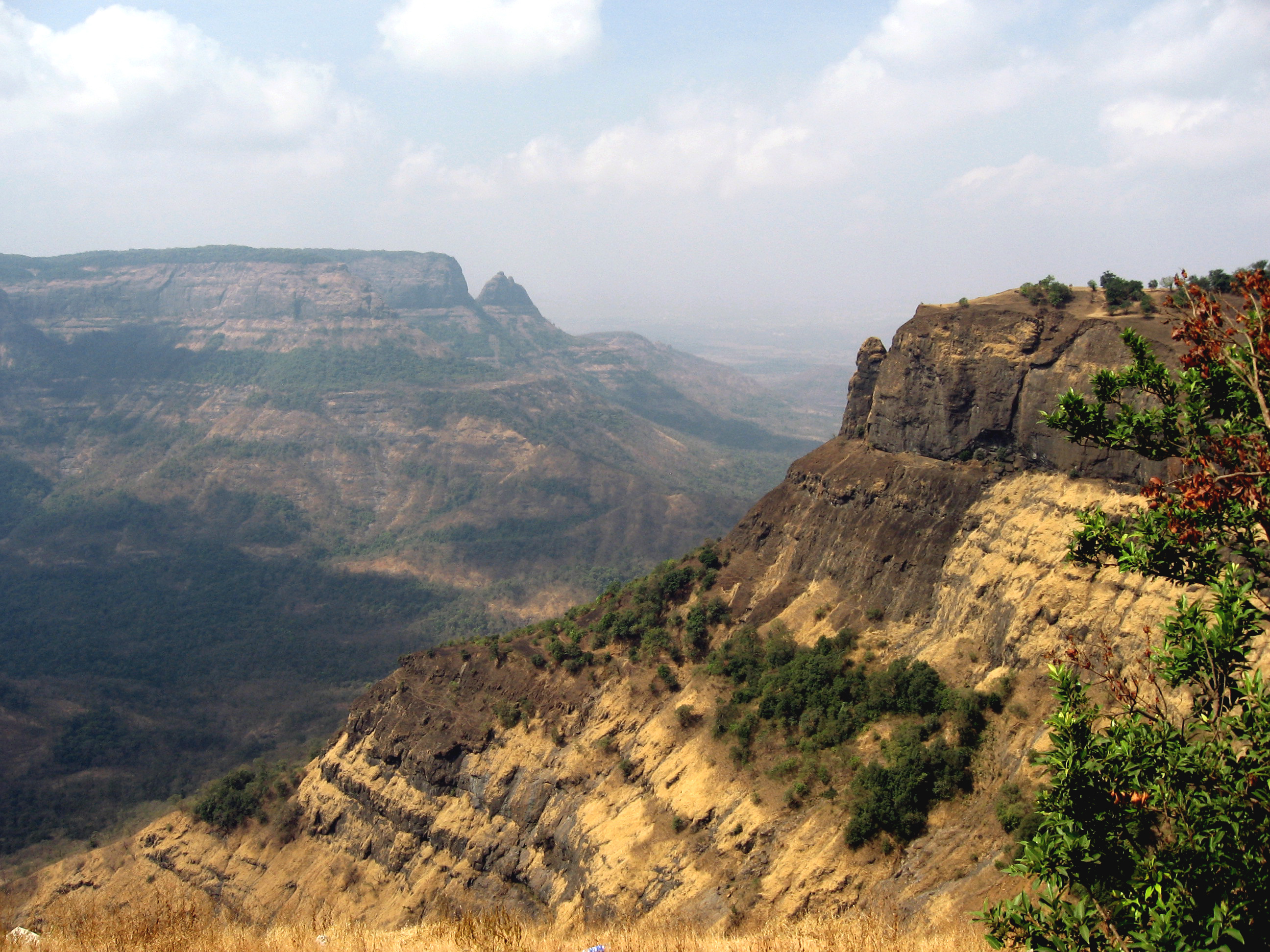
Deccan Traps were formed by lava flows in the Cretaceous era (66 mya).

The Deccan Plateau is one of the oldest and most stable land formations in the Indian subcontinent. The plateau is marked by rocky terrain with an average of about 600 m (2,000 ft). The Deccan Traps consist of multiple layers of igneous rocks, which are more than 2 km (1.2 mi) in thickness. These rocks were laid down by basaltic lava flows which emerged from deep inside the Earth's crust following a massive volcanic eruption.

The eruption event occurred during the end of the Cretaceous period (66 mya) and is the second largest volcanic eruption ever recorded on land. Scientists state that the volcanic event would have released large amounts of ash, dust and carbon dioxide into the atmosphere. The release would have blocked sunlight resulting in lower temperatures and caused major climatic changes on Earth. The eruption would have resulted in high levels of sulfur, chlorine and other toxic gases in the atmosphere. Researchers argue that the volcanic event would have contributed to the extinction of various species including some of the dinosaurs.

The volcanic deposits stretch more than 500,000 km^{2} (190,000 sq mi) encompassing neighbouring central highlands. The deposits consist of three subgroups based on the time and level of deposition. Underlying the lava deposits are granite and sedimentary rocks formed during the Precambrian era and the formation of Gondwanaland. The Indo-Gangetic Plain rests on hard crystalline rocks which connect the Himalayan region with the plateau region. Apart from granite, parts of the region consists of metamorphic rocks such as gneiss, and schist.

The Deccan Plateau region is rich in mineral deposits like iron ore, coal, and mica. Precious and semi precious stones have also been mined from the region. Large uranium deposits have been discovered in the region in the 21st century. There are two major soil types, forming distinct sub-regions of the plateau. Most of the region with igneous basaltic rock consists of black soil. These soils have a high clay content, retain moisture and are resistant to erosion, but develop cracks during the dry season. The gneiss peneplain region in the low rainfall areas in the eastern vicinity of the Western Ghats consist of infertile red soil.

== Geography ==
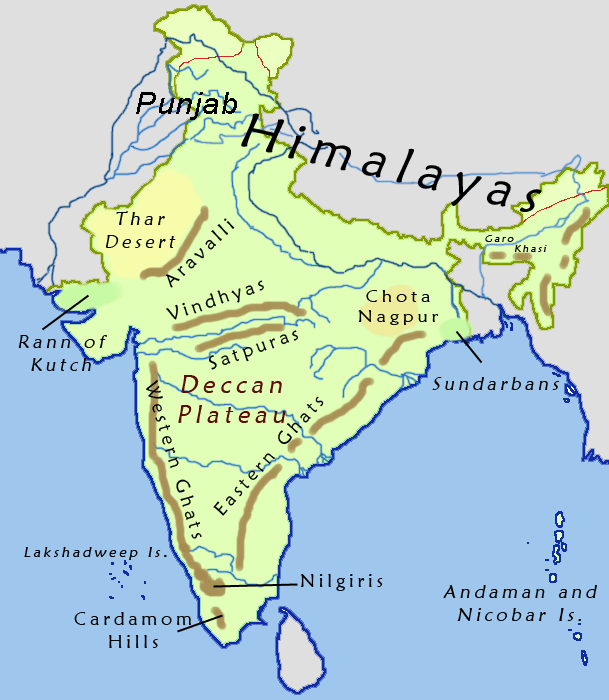
Regions of India, showing the Deccan Plateau surrounded by the various mountain ranges.

Historians have used the term Deccan differently across various time periods. Firishta (16th century), R. G. Bhandarkar (1920), and Richard Eaton (2005) demarcate the region based on linguistic lines. K. M. Panikkar (1969) defines it as the entire Indian peninsula south of the Vindhyas. Stewart Gordon (1998) notes that Deccan is a "relational term" and historically the border of Deccan has varied from Tapti River to the Godavari River, depending on the southern boundary of the northern empires and is used to denote "the area beyond the southern border of a northern-based kingdom" of India.

Geographers have defined the extent of Deccan region using various physical features and indices such as rainfall, vegetation, or soil type. As per a broader geographical definition, the region consists of the peninsular tableland lying to the south of the Tropic of Cancer, marked by the Vindhya-Satpura ranges in the north. The Deccan is a plateau region extending over an area of 422,000 km^{2} (163,000 sq mi) and occupies the majority of the Indian peninsula. It is shaped like an inverted triangle with its upper boundary at the Narmada River basin near the Vindhya-Satpura ranges and the lower boundary at the northern fringes of Tamil Nadu in the south.

The region is bound by the mountain ranges of the Western Ghats and the Eastern Ghats on the sides, which separate the region from the Western and Eastern Coastal Plains respectively. It covers most of the Indian states of Maharashtra, Telangana, Karnataka and Andhra Pradesh excluding the coastal regions, and minor portions of Tamil Nadu and Kerala. The western side of the plateau is elevated gently slopes towards the east. It is subdivided into Maharashtra Plateau, Karnataka Plateau, and Telangana Plateau. Several major cities such as Bengaluru, Hyderabad, and Pune, are situated on the plateau region.

=== Hydrography and climate ===
Average rainfall Map showing the low rainfall areas in the interior of the plateau.

The Deccan forms one of the major watersheds of India, feeding many perennial rivers. The major river systems originating in the Western Ghats are the Godavari, Kaveri, and Krishna. Most rivers flow eastwards towards the Bay of Bengal owing to the steeper gradient moving from east to west, with only smaller streams flowing in the opposite direction. The streams and rivers give rise to numerous waterfalls in the region. The rivers have been dammed for hydroelectric and irrigation purposes, with major reservoirs spread across the region.

The region has largely semi-arid climate in the northern parts and tropical climate in most of the other areas. The summer months of April – May are dry and hot with maximum temperatures often rising more than 40 °C (104 °F). During the dry summer months of April – May, heat builds up on the interior of the Deccan Plateau, which draws air from the sea. The air, which picks up moisture along the way and flows eastward from the Arabian Sea, is blocked by the Western Ghats. The rising air cools and brings about orographic precipitation along the western coast, which signifies the onset of the monsoon season in June.

By the time the air rises above the mountains, it becomes dry, resulting in a rain shadow region with very little rainfall on the leeward side towards the interior of the Deccan plateau. The monsoon winds rounding up the peninsula and moving from the east from the Bay of Bengal pass over the Eastern Ghats and bring some rainfall to the eastern region of the plateau. The region receives most of the rainfall during the months of July to September and the rains feed the rivers that flow into basins and then into the Bay of Bengal.

=== Flora and fauna ===
There is a wide diversity of plants and animals in the region, resulting from its varied climates and geography. scrub lands are common in the low rainfall regions with dry deciduous forests found in the southern part of the plateau. The woodlands of the region are older than the Himalayas. The central part of the plateau is covered by woodlands formed by trees such as hardwickia, teak, siris, axlewood, boswellia, and acacia trees. The region hosts significant populations of endangered Bengal tigers and Indian elephants Other mammals found in the region include gaur, blackbuck, chinkara, four-horned antelope, wild buffalo, and Indian wild dog.

== Demographics ==
Population density map of India, showing the sparsely populated plateau region

The largest linguistic group in the region is the Dravidian family of languages, of approximately 73 languages. The Telugus and Kannadigas who speak Telugu and Kannada form the major demographic groups in the central region. Tamils and Malayalis form a part of the southern end of the plateau. Marathi people, who speak Marathi, an Indo-Aryan language, form the majority in the north-western part of the plateau. English is also widely spoken in urban areas of the region. Deccani, a regional dialect of Urdu, is also spoken.

Evidence of prehistoric religion in the region comes from scattered Mesolithic rock paintings depicting dances and rituals, such as the Kupgal petroglyphs of eastern Karnataka, at Stone Age sites. Hinduism is the major religion today in the region.

The total fertility rate in the region was less than the population replacement level and as a result, the proportion of the population of the region to India's total population has declined in the last four decades. The economies of the states in the region registered a growth higher than the national average over the past three decades. While the states have improved in some of the socio-economic metrics, there is wide disparity within the region.

== Economy ==
Agriculture is often difficult in low rainfall areas, which require additional irrigation facilities while it is more Easy to do in the river valleys. Agriculture is still the primary occupation in the region. Rice is the staple food and major crop in the region. Others crops cultivated include sugarcane, banana, cotton, turmeric, millets, pulses, and spices. The urban centres are significant contributors to the Indian and global Information Technology economy. The presence of these hubs has spurred economic growth and attracted foreign investments and job seekers from other parts of the country. Manufacturing and textiles are other major industries in the region.

== Culture ==
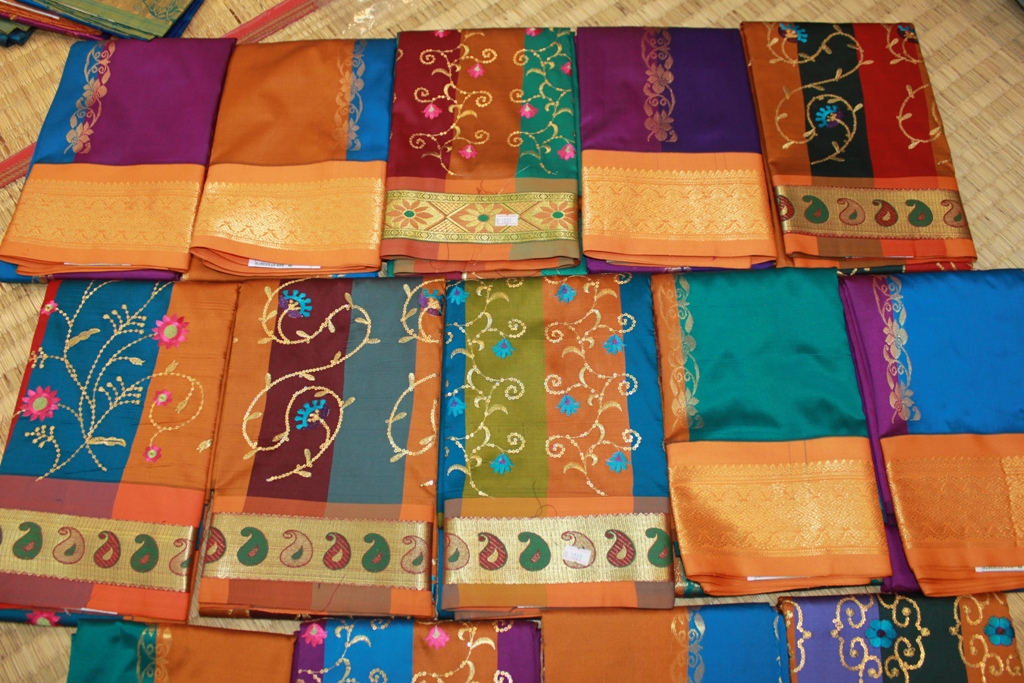
Sari worn by women in the region.

As defined by Ministry of Culture of the Government of India to promote and preserve the cultural heritage, the region falls under the purview of West and South Zone Cultural Centers. The women traditionally wear a sari, a garment that consists of a drape varying from 5 yd (4.6 m) to 9 yd (8.2 m) in length and 2 ft (0.61 m) to 4 ft (1.2 m) in breadth that is typically wrapped around the waist, with one end draped over the shoulder, baring the midriff, as according to Indian philosophy, the navel is considered as the source of life and creativity. The men wear a dhoti, a 4.5 m (15 ft) long, white rectangular piece of non-stitched cloth often bordered in brightly coloured stripes. It is usually wrapped around the waist and the legs and knotted at the waist. A colourful lungi with typical batik patterns is the most common form of male attire in the countryside. People in urban areas generally wear tailored clothing, and western dress is popular. Western-style school uniforms are worn by both boys and girls in schools, even in rural areas.

The region has a rich cuisine involving both traditional non-vegetarian and vegetarian dishes. The traditional way of eating a meal involves eating food served on a banana leaf using the right hand. Rice is the staple food in meals of the region. Bhakri made of millets and roti or chapathi made of wheat served with dal are popular in the north and western parts of the region. Idli and dosa served with sambar and chutney for breakfast and rice served with sambar and rasam for lunch are popular in the eastern and southern parts of the region. Hyderabadi cuisine is popular for its biryani.

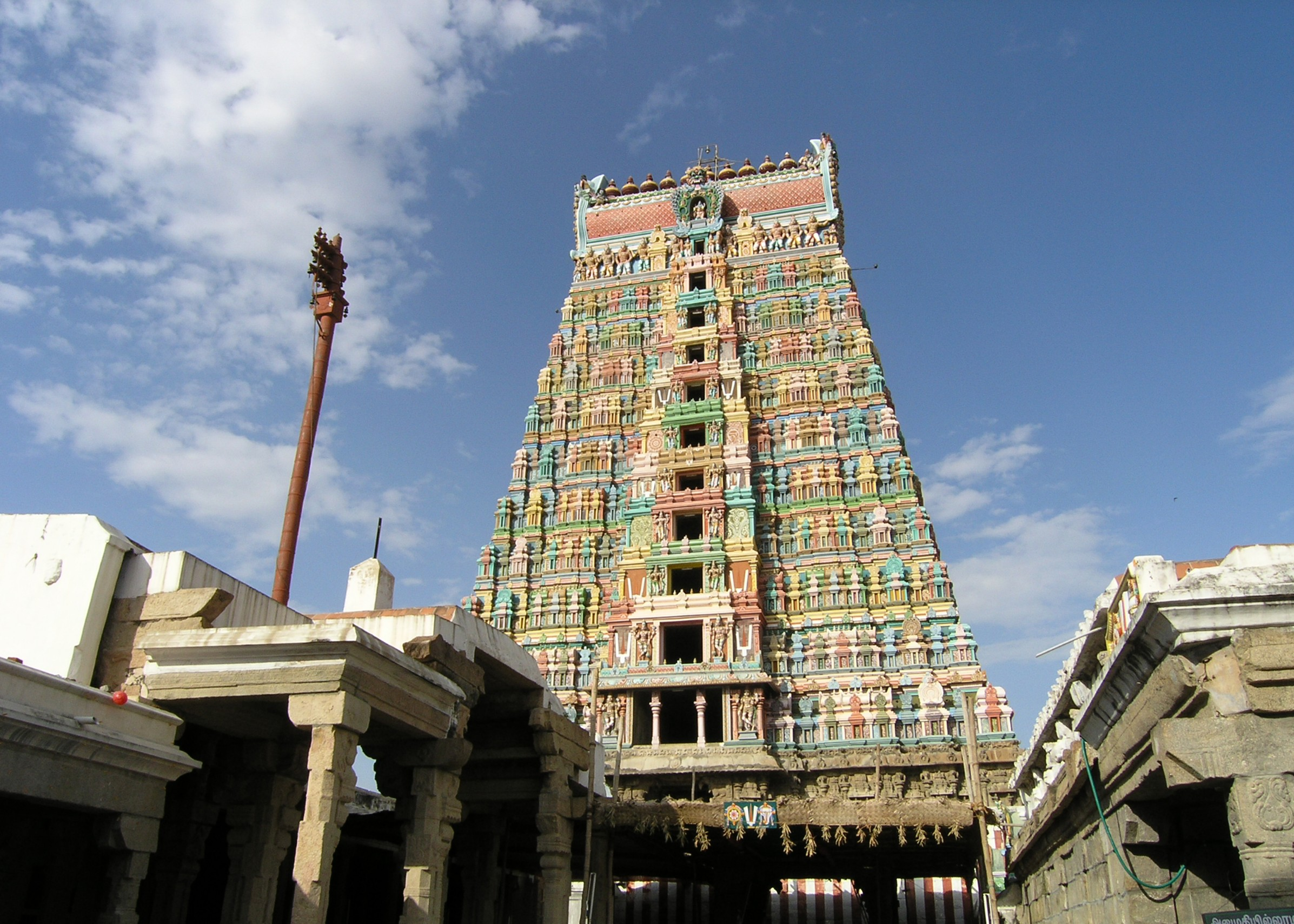
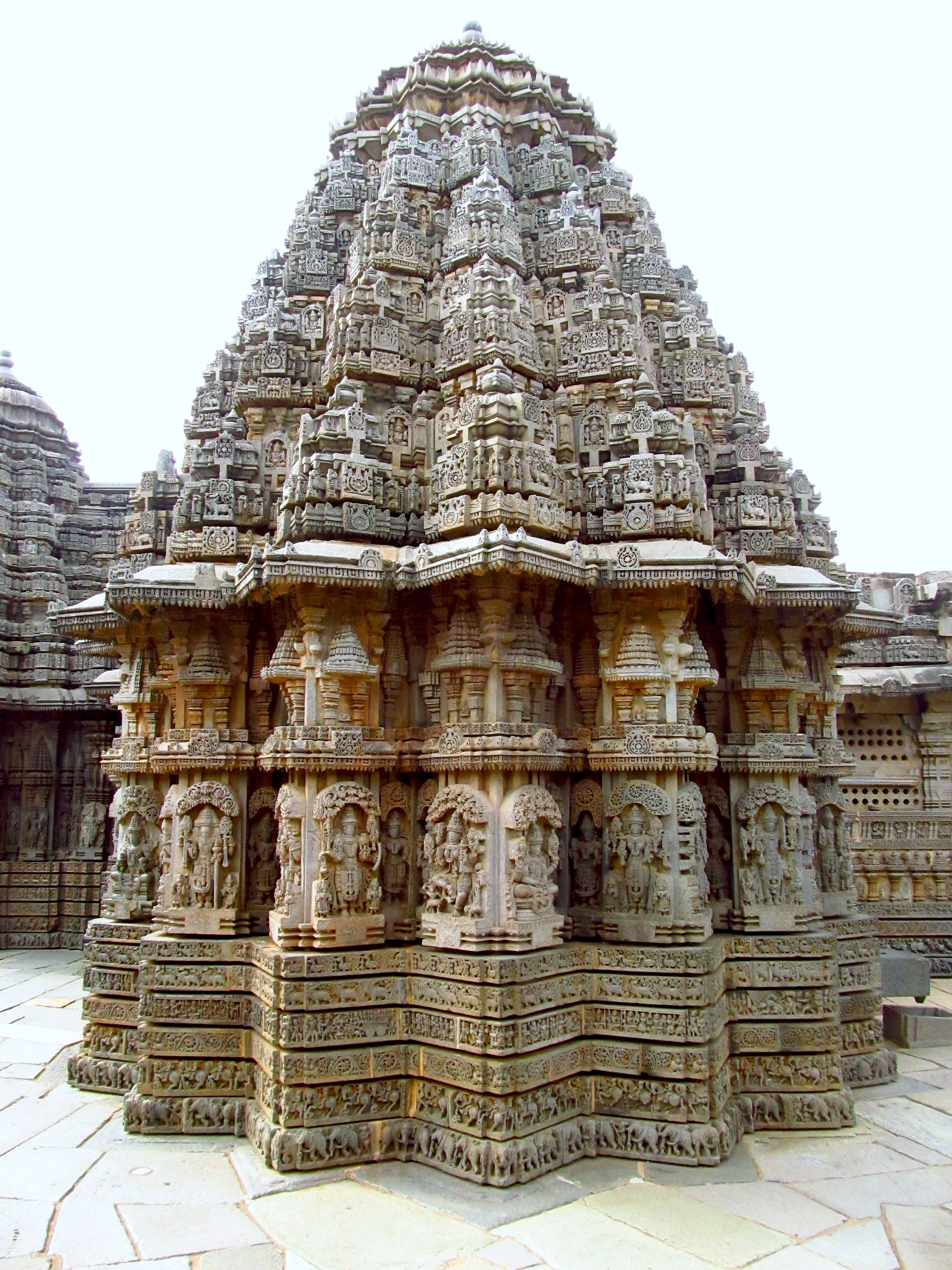
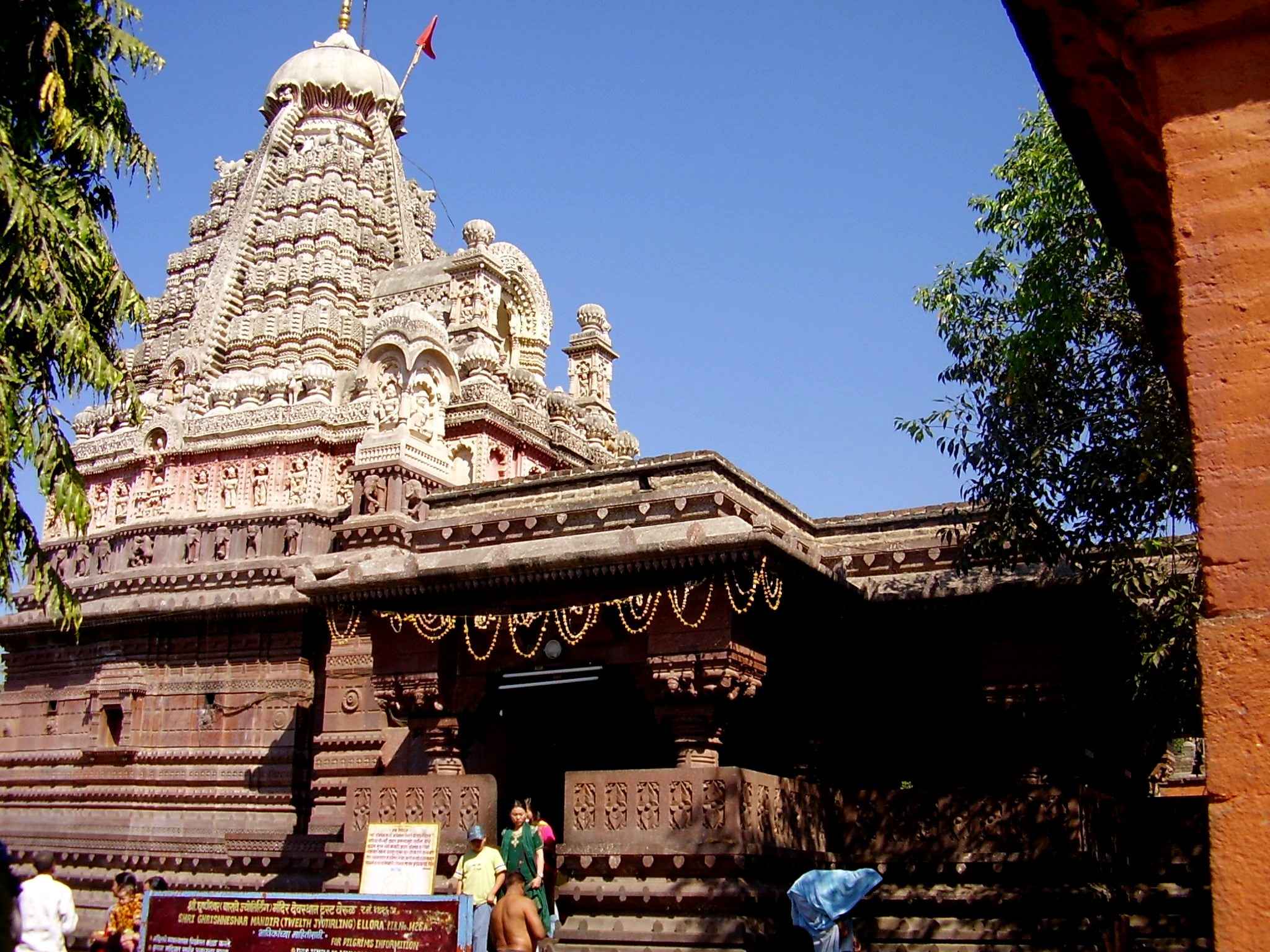
Dravidian (left), Vesara (center), and Nagara architecture.

The region is home to various music and dance forms such as Kuchipudi, Lavani, Yakshagana, and Bharatanatyam. There are three distinct styles of Hindu Temple architecture, the Dravidian style of Tamil Nadu, Andhra Pradesh, the Vesara style of Karnataka, Telangana, and the Nagara style of Maharashtra. In Dravidian architecture, the temples considered of large gate-pyramids or Gopurams in quadrangular enclosures that surround the temple with large pillared halls. Vimanam are similar structures built over the garbhagriha or inner sanctum of the temple but are usually smaller than the gopurams in the Dravidian architecture. In the Nagara style, the temples had one or more shikharas, which are towers similar to the vimanas. The Vesara style is a hybrid of both these architectural styles.

== Transport ==
Highway distribution with population density.

There is an extensive road network composed of National Highways, State Highways and other roads in the region. The Golden Quadrilateral connecting the major cities in the country traverses across the region. Public bus services are mostly provided by state-run transport corporations.

The Madras Railway was established in 1845 and the Great Indian Peninsular Railway was incorporated in 1849. The construction on the first main line in the South between Royapuram in Madras and Arcot started in 1853, which became operational on 1 July 1856. In 1879, the Nizam's Guaranteed State Railway was established which built railway lines across the then Hyderabad State and the Mysore State Railway was established to build an extension of Madras Railway in Mysore State. In 1880, the Great Indian Peninsula Railway built a railway network radiating from Madras. The Madras and Southern Mahratta Railway was founded on 1 January 1908 by merging the Madras Railway and the Southern Mahratta Railway. In 1950, there were about 42 different railway companies across the country which were amalgamated in steps to form a single entity named as Indian Railways. On 14 April 1951, the Madras and Southern Mahratta Railway, the South Indian Railway, and the Mysore State Railway were merged to form the Southern Railway, the first zone of Indian Railways. The Western was established on 5 November 1951, the South Central zone on 2 October 1966, and the South Western zone on 1 April 2003. Most of the region is covered by these four zones, with small portions of the coasts covered by East Coast Railway and Konkan Railway. Metro and suburban systems are operational in major cities.

Air transport in the region started in the late 1910s with commercial services beginning in the 1930s. The region has multiple international and domestic airports. Chennai International Airport serves as the Southern Regional Headquarters of the Airports Authority of India, the Southern Region comprising the states of Andhra Pradesh, Karnataka, Kerala, Tamil Nadu, and Telangana, and Mumbai International Airport serves the state of Maharashtra. The southern region comes under the purview of the Southern Air Command of the Indian Air Force and the north western region comes under the South Western Air Command.

== See also ==
- Central Highlands
- Eastern Coastal Plains
- Indo-Gangetic Plain
- Western Coastal Plains
- List of volcanoes in India
