= Central Highlands (India) =

Geological structure and biogeographic region in India

The Central Highlands of India is a large geological structure and biogeographic region located between the Deccan Plateau and the Indo-Gangetic plains consisting of number of mountain ranges, including Vindhya and Aravali ranges, and the Chota Nagpur and Malwa plateaus. It is the single most important feature of Central India. It extends over three linguistic sub-regions of the Indo-Aryan language family and the languages chiefly spoken here are, from west to east, Marwari, Malwi, Bundeli, Bagheli, Chhattisgarhi and Maithili. The population is primarily Indo-Aryan along with a large population of Aboriginal tribes.

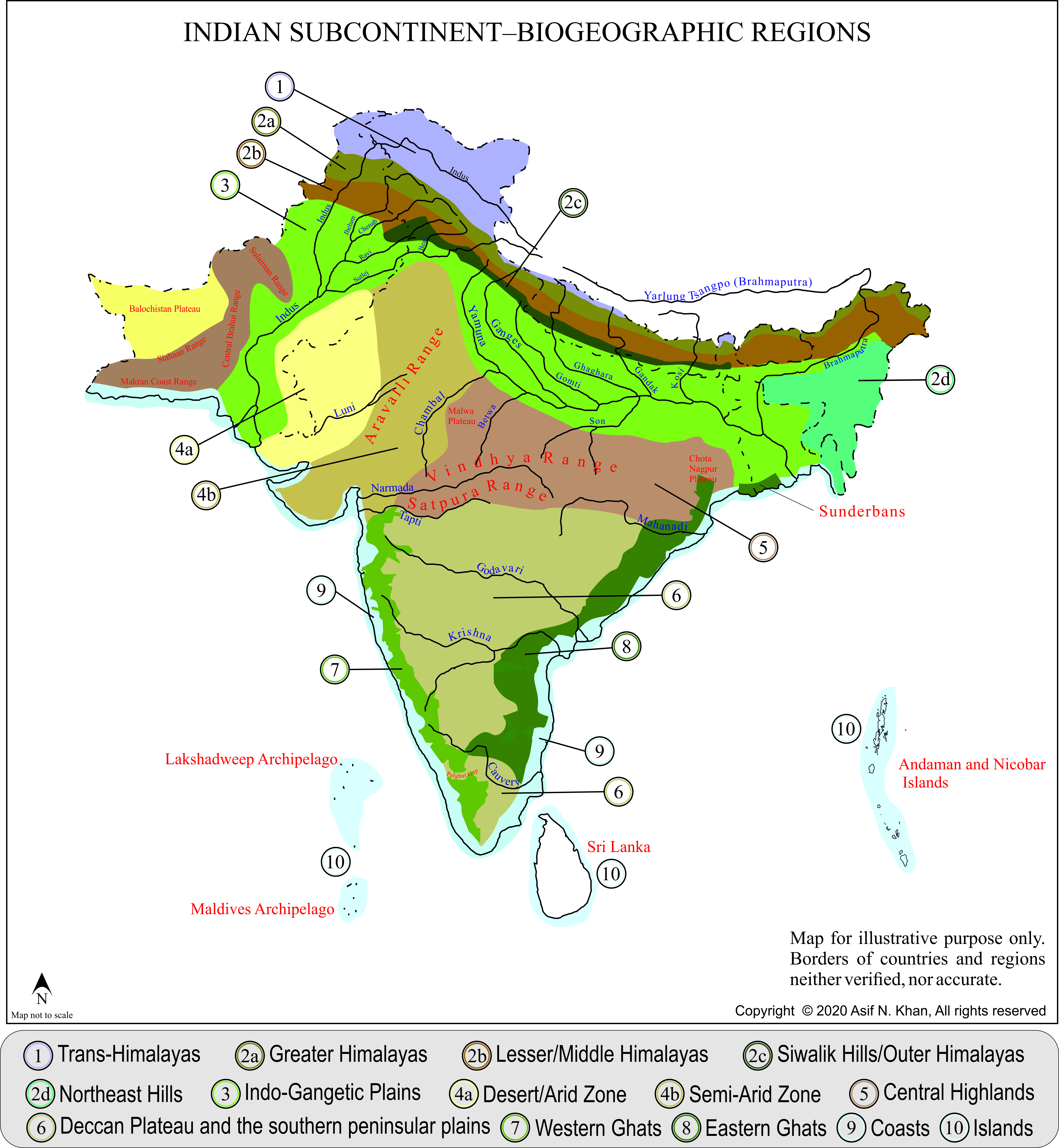
The Central Highlands along with other geographical features of India

This region is widely populated with dense woods and number of different aboriginal tribal groups live here, who practice different forms of Hinduism. Many empires and dynasties have failed to conquer or have had a hard time controlling it due to resistance from the aborigines, as early as the famed Mauryans of Magadha and even the modern-day Indian Republic. The region is a hotbed of the Naxalite-Maoist insurgency, especially the eastern part.

The region has the second largest tribal population of all regions of India, next only to North-East India. It has a significantly less population density that other parts of India such as the coastal regions and the great northern plains. It is spread over the states of Jharkhand, Madhya Pradesh, Chhattisgarh (northern part) and Rajasthan (eastern part).

== Divisions and features ==
The Central Highlands can be divided into North Central Highlands and South Central Highlands. The North Central Highlands can be divided into (a) the Aravalli Range, (b) Eastern Rajasthan Upland, (c) Madhya Bharat Plateau, and (d) Bundelkhand Upland. The South Central Highland can be divided into (a) Malwa Plateau, (b) Vindhya Scraplands, (c) Vindhya Range, and (d) Narmada Valley.

The Aravalli range extends from Delhi south-west to near Ahmedabad for a distance of about 800 km. To the east of the Aravalli range lies the East Rajasthan Upland that ranges in height from 250 to 500 m. The Chambal River enters the State of Rajasthan near the northern end of the Gandhi Sagar Reservoir and flows for 360 km in Rajasthan. The Madhya Bharat Plateau area has a rocky surface and dense forests to the east of the Chambal. The other part of the northern part of the Central Highlands is that part of Bundelkhand which lies between the Yamuna and the northern arcuate scrap of the Vindhyan plateau.

As already noted, the southern part of the Central Highlands comprises the Malwa plateau, the Vindhya scraplands, the Vindhya range, and the Narmada Valley. The Vindhya range "is really an escarpment which varies in character and height, depending on the structure and lithology of the underlying rocks. For the first 100 km from its western terminus, Gomanpur peak (554 m) in the Dhar district of Madhya Pradesh, the Vindhya range runs in curve, its convex side facing the Narmada valley and following a 300 m contour line. It is heavily forested and sparsely populated. For the next 160 km a more open type of country prevails and the escarpment, still built of basalt, becomes more prominent near Hoshangabad the rock type changes; the Vindhya mountain comes down very close to the Narmada river and presents a terraced slope built of hard sand stones alternating with shales." To the north of the Vindhya range lies the Malwa plateau in Madhya Pradesh with a general northward slope, good drainage, and black soil. The strong sandstones of the Kaimur, Rewa, and Bhander are the principal makers of the Vindhyan scraplands and also form the surface of the three constituent plateaus descending in steps from west to east. To the extreme south of the Central Highlands lies the Narmada Valley.

== See also ==
- Austroasiatics
- Adivasi
- North India
