= Western Coastal Plains =

Coastal plain in Western India

- Geographical region
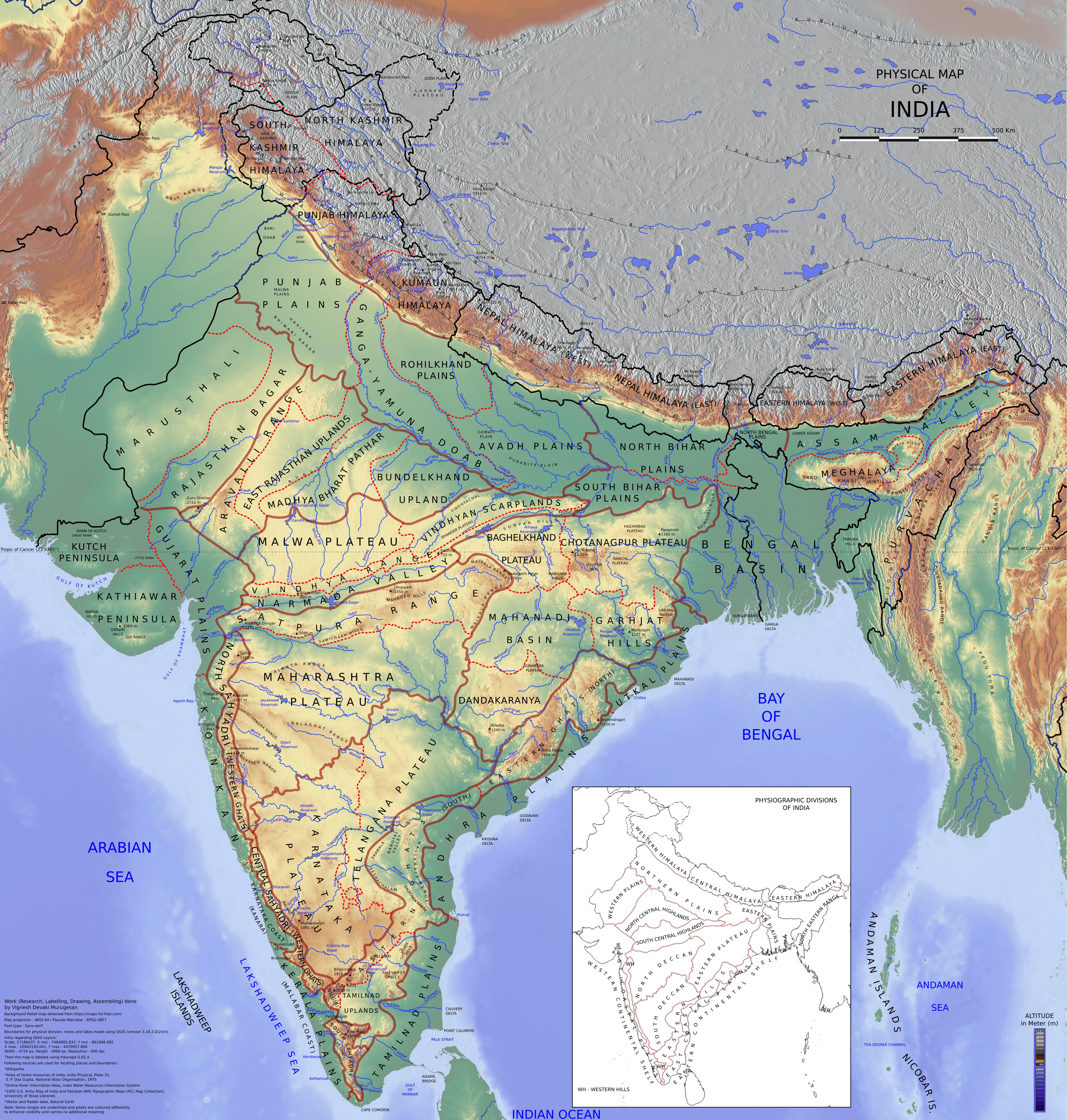
- Physical map of India, showing the different topographical regions
- Country: India
- State(s): Gujarat; Maharashtra; Goa; Karnataka; Kerala
- Largest city: Mumbai

Languages
  - Major: Gujarati, Kannada, Konkani, Marathi, Malayalam, Tulu
- Time zone: Indian Standard Time

The Western Coastal Plains is a narrow stretch of landmass lying between the western part of the Deccan Plateau and the Arabian Sea in India. The plains stretch from the Kutch region in the Western India to Kaniyakumari at the southern tip of the Indian peninsula, with the Western Ghats forming its eastern boundary. It traverses the states of Gujarat, Maharashtra, Goa, Karnataka, and Kerala.

The plains are broadly divided into six subdivisions–Kutch and Kathiawar along with the Gujarat Plains in the north, Konkan Coast and Canara in the center, and Malabar in the south. Due to the presence of Western Ghats, which blocks the rain-bearing winds, the region from the south of Gujarat experiences heavy rainfall during the monsoons. Unlike the Eastern Coastal Plains, very few rivers cut across the region due to the steeper gradient of the Indian peninsula moving from east to west and the major rivers include Narmada and Tapti.

== Geography ==
The Western Coastal Plains is a stretch of coastal land lying between the western edge of the Deccan Plateau and the Arabian Sea in the west. The plains stretch from the Rann of Kutch region to Kaniyakumari at the southern tip of the Indian peninsula. The average width of the plains vary between 50–100 km (31–62 mi). It traverses the states of Gujarat, Gujarat, Maharashtra, Goa, Karnataka, Kerala and the union territories of Dadra and Nagar Haveli and Daman and Diu, and Puducherry (Mahe). It is narrower than the Eastern Coastal Plains and both the coastal plains meet at Kaniyakumari.

The mountain range of Western Ghats forms a rough eastern boundary of the plains. The Western Ghats extend from the Satpura Range south of the Tapti River in the north and runs approximately 1,600 km (990 mi) to Kaniyakumari. There are three gaps in the mountain range which connect the plains to the Deccan plateau: the northernmost Goa Gap, the oldest and widest Palghat Gap, and the southernmost, narrowest Shencottah Gap.

== Hydrography and climate ==
Annual rainfall

The Western Ghats serves as one of the major sources of many perennial rivers in India. The major river systems originating in the Western Ghats are the Godavari, Kaveri, and Krishna. However, most of the rivers flow eastwards towards the Bay of Bengal owing to the steeper gradient moving from east to west. The region consists of only smaller streams, which often carry a large volume of water during the monsoon months. The largest rivers are Narmada and Tapti which flow north of the Western Ghats in the Gujarat plains.

The northern region of Kutch is relatively dry and arid. The Western Ghats play an important role in determining the climate and seasons of the region. During the dry summer months of April – May, heat builds up on the land, which draws air from the sea. The air, which picks up moisture along the way and flows eastward from the Arabian Sea, is blocked by the Western Ghats. The rising air cools and brings about orographic precipitation along the western coast. This signifies the onset of the monsoon season in June. By the time the air rises above the mountains, it becomes dry, having brought heavy rainfall to the coast.

The region experiences a warm and humid tropical climate throughout the year. Mean temperatures range from 20 °C (68 °F) in the south to 24 °C (75 °F) in the north. Subtropical or temperate climates, and occasional near-zero temperatures during winter are experienced in regions with higher elevations. The coldest period in the region are the wettest monsoon period in the southern part of the mountain range. Annual rainfall in this region averages 100 cm (39 in) to 900 cm (350 in), with an average rainfall of 250 cm (98 in). The total amount of rain does not depend on the spread of the area; areas in northern Maharashtra receive heavy rainfall followed by long dry spells, while regions closer to the equator receive lower annual rainfall and have rain spells lasting several months in a year.

== Sub-divisions ==
The plains are broadly divided into six subdivisions–Kutch and Kathiawar along with the Gujarat Plains in the north, Konkan Coast and Canara in the center, and Malabar in the south.

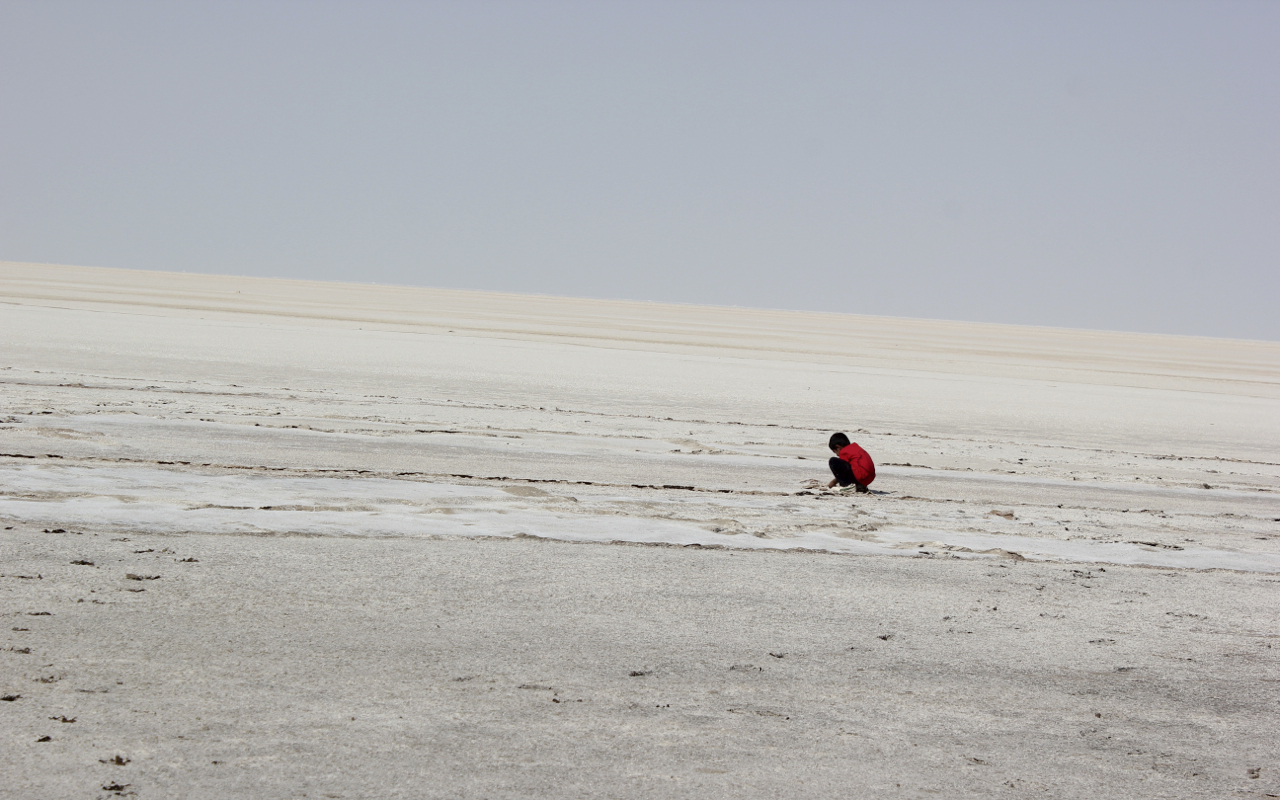
Salt marshes in Kutch

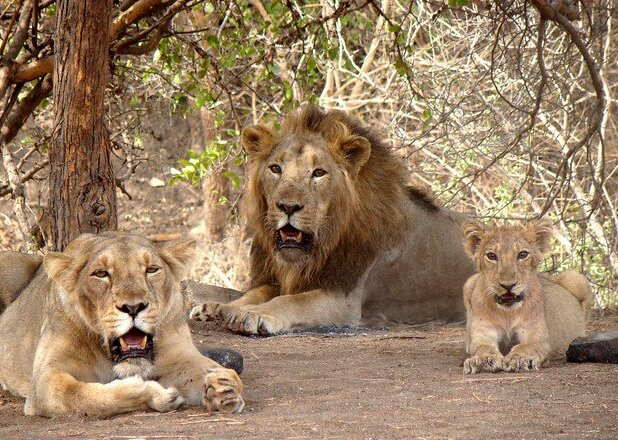
Asiatic Lions at Gir

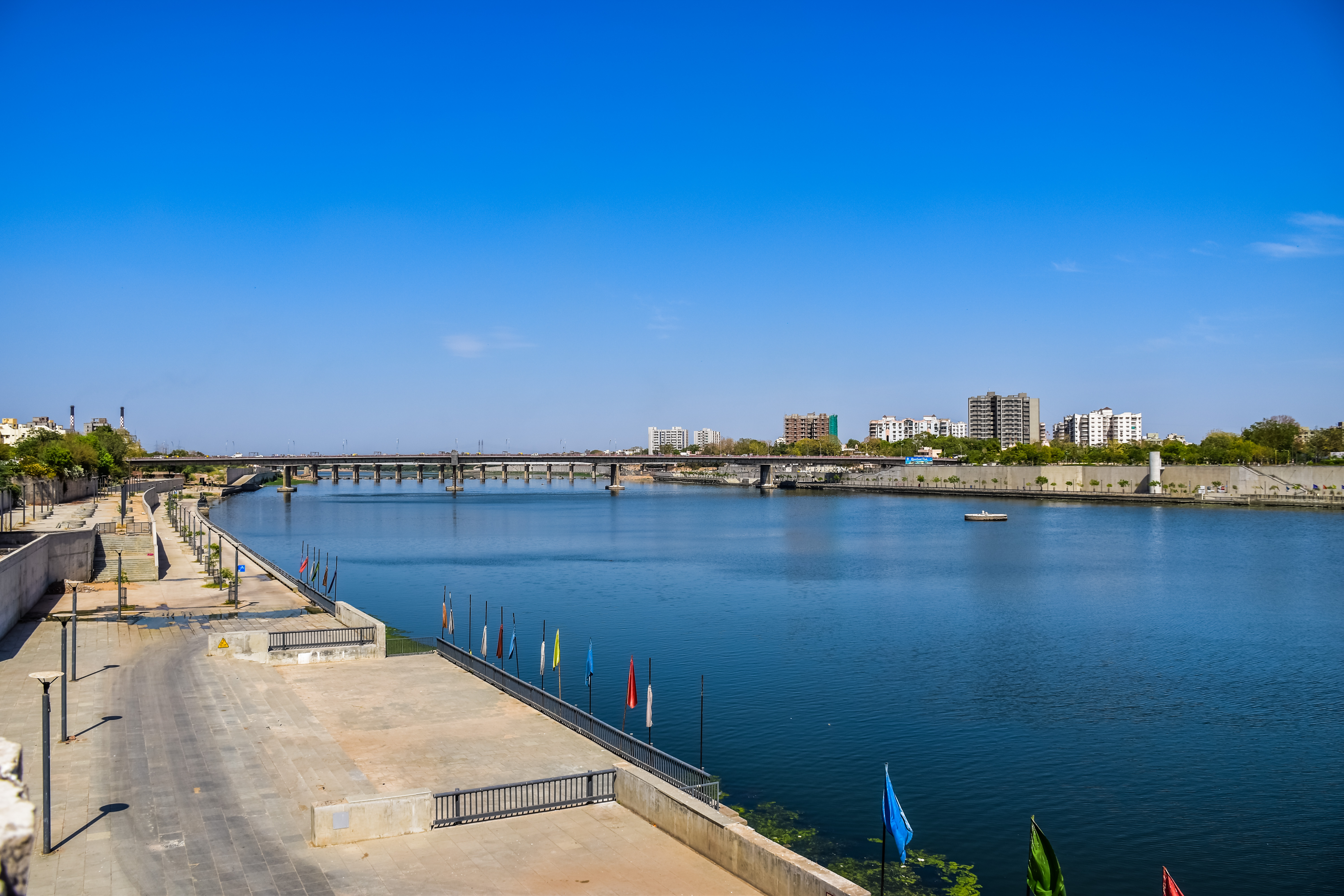
Sabarmati at Ahmedabad

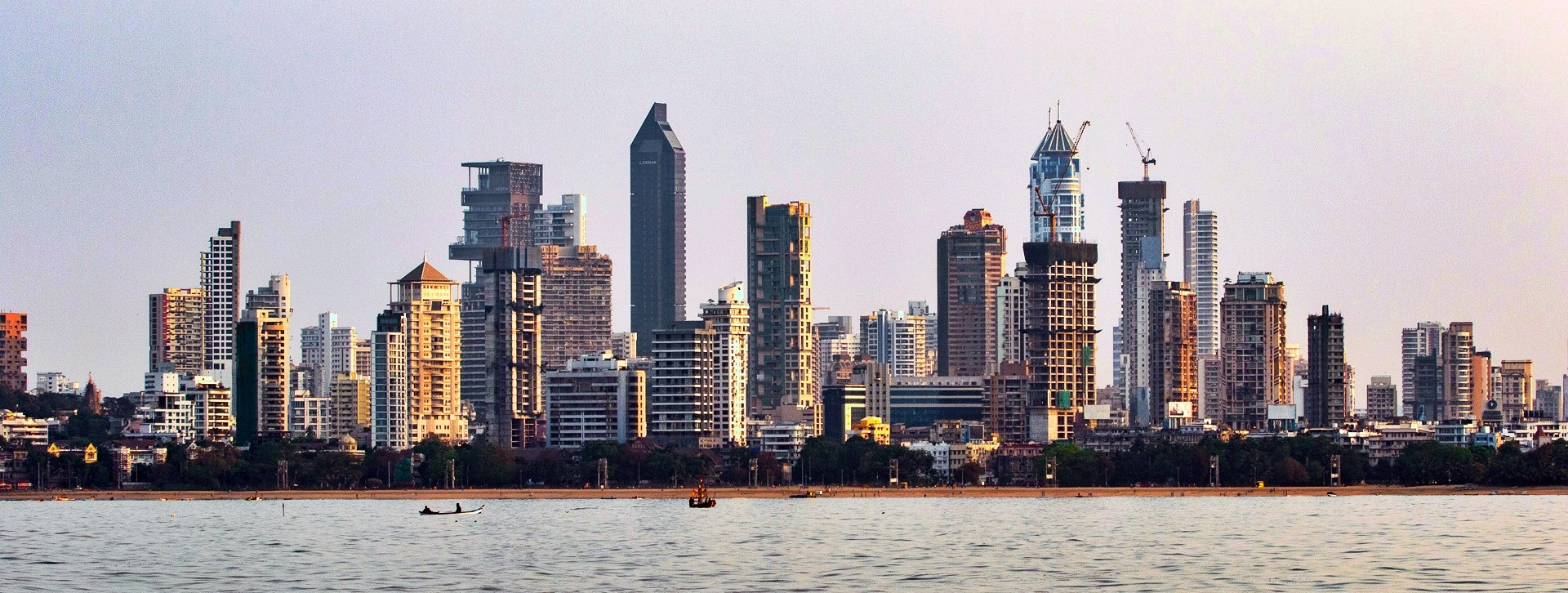
Skyline of Mumbai

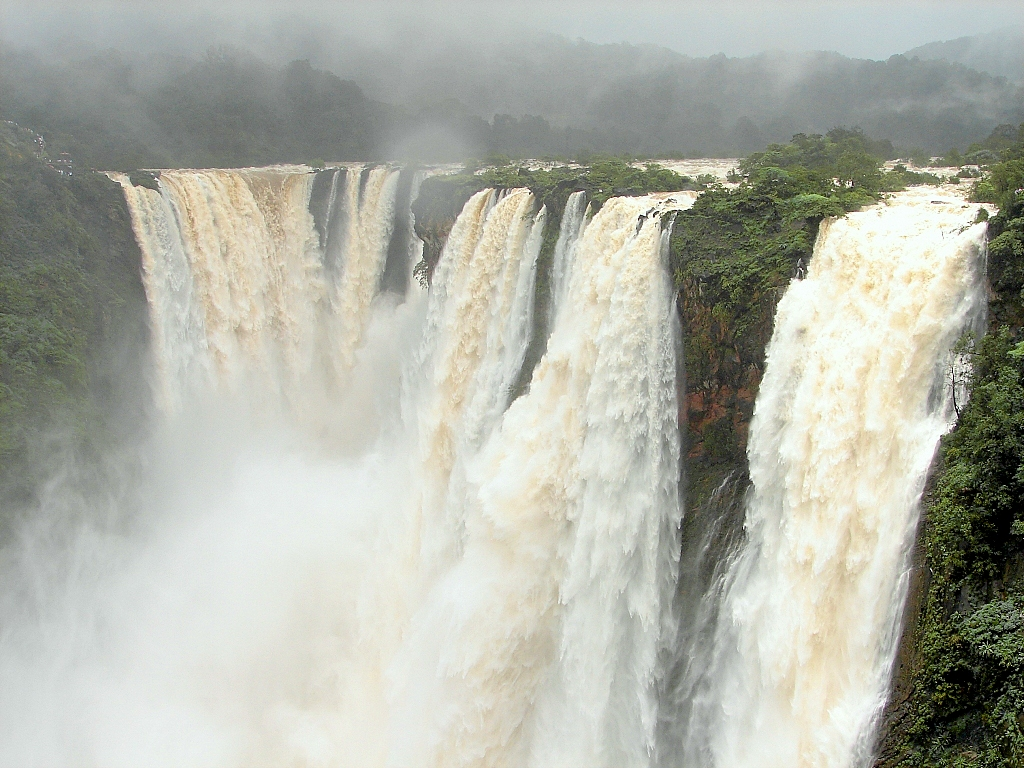
Jog Falls on Sharavati River

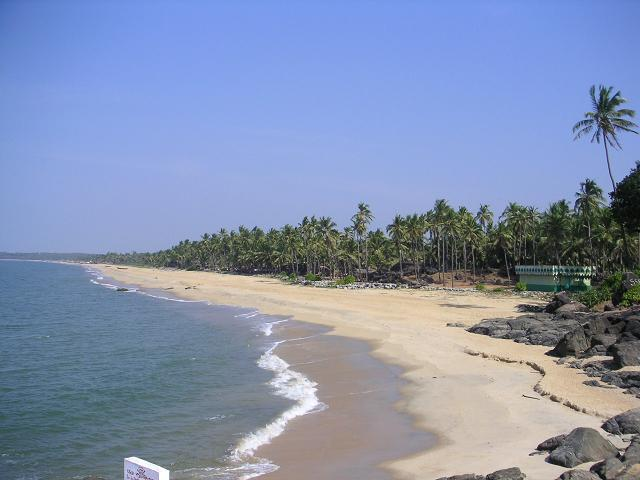
Typical Malabar Coast.

=== Kutch ===
The Kutch Peninsula occupies an area of 45,612 km^{2} (17,611 sq mi) and forms the western most part of the Indian mainland, bordering Pakistan. The 352 km (219 mi) long coastline stretches from the Indus River delta in the north to the Gulf of Kutch. The Rann of Kutch occupies most of the region and is semi-arid and dry. The region has a long history of human settlements dating back to the Indus Valley Civilization in 3000 BCE.

=== Kathiawar ===
The Kathiawar region (also called as Saurashtra), extends from the Gulf of Kutch in the north to the Gulf of Khambhat in the south in Gujarat. The northeast of the peninsular consists of a large sandstone formation extending for 60,000 km^{2} (23,000 sq mi). The vegetation of this section is dry, with thorn forests. It is surrounded by alluvial soil supporting agricultural crops such as wheat, millet, and peanut. Isolated mangroves occur along the coast. Most of the region has an altitude lower than 600 ft (180 m) with the exception of Girnar Hills and Gir Range. The region hosts the Gir National Park, the only remaining abode of wild Asiatic lions anywhere in the world.

=== Gujarat Plains ===
The Gujarat Plains extend from the Thar Desert in the north to the border with Maharashtra. It forms the central part of Gujarat and lies to the east of the Kathiawar peninsula. The area extends for about 33,000 km^{2} (13,000 sq mi) and has an average elevation of 24 m (79 ft). It is an extension of the Indo-Gangetic Plain and is drained by rivers such as Narmada, Tapti, Sabarmati, and Mahi. Most of the region consists of alluvium deposited by the rivers with black soil occurring to the west. The region is prone to heavy flooding during monsoons. Sparse forests occur in the region with hardwood trees like acacia, and teak. Agriculture is the major contributor to the economy with crops grown including cereals, peanuts, oil seeds, and tobacco. Dairy farming and cotton farming are other major industries. The region which encompassed the city of Ahmedabad, is also heavily industrialised.

=== Konkan ===
The Konkan Coast (also called Aparanta) extends the Daman Ganga River in the north of Maharashtra to the Terekhol River along the border with the Goa in the south. The narrow region stretches between 28–47 mi (45–76 km) in width and forms the northern part of the linear coast between the Western Ghats and the Arabian Sea. The region consists of uneven topography formed by the erosion of rivers with alternating bays. Most of the population is concentrated around the city of Mumbai and smaller fertile river valleys. The region receives heavy rainfall during the monsoons, which gives rise to many seasonal rivers. Only one third of the land is cultivable with major crops including rice, pulses, and coconuts. Fishing, mining, and salt manufacturing are other major economic activities.

=== Canara ===
The Canara or the Karnataka Coastal Plain extends about 225 km (140 mi) from Goa in the north to Mangalore in the south. The region has an average width of 30–50 km (19–31 mi), and is widest at 70 km (43 mi) near Mangalore. The region is composed of numerous spurs and projections from the Western Ghats, which narrows the coastal region to almost 5 km (3.1 mi) in certain areas. These spurs rise to about 600 m (2,000 ft) and give rise to numerous streams, which form various waterfalls across the region. The Jog Falls on Sharavati River is the second highest plunge waterfall in India at 271 m (889 ft) high.

=== Malabar ===
The Malabar Coast forms the southern end of the plains stretching about 480 km (300 mi) across the entire coast of Kerala till Kanniyakumari. The width varies between 19–97 km (12–60 mi) and is narrower in the north. The region covers an area of 28,000 km^{2} (11,000 sq mi) and is interspersed with a number of lagoons. The average altitude is below 10 m (33 ft) with sandy beaches on the west. Many streams and inland waterways cut across the region with the major rivers being Periyar River in the southern part of Kerala. Coconut palms are grown across the region.

== See also ==
- Deccan Plateau
- Eastern Coastal Plains
- Western Ghats
