= Eastern Coastal Plains =

Coastal plain Eastern India

- Geographical region
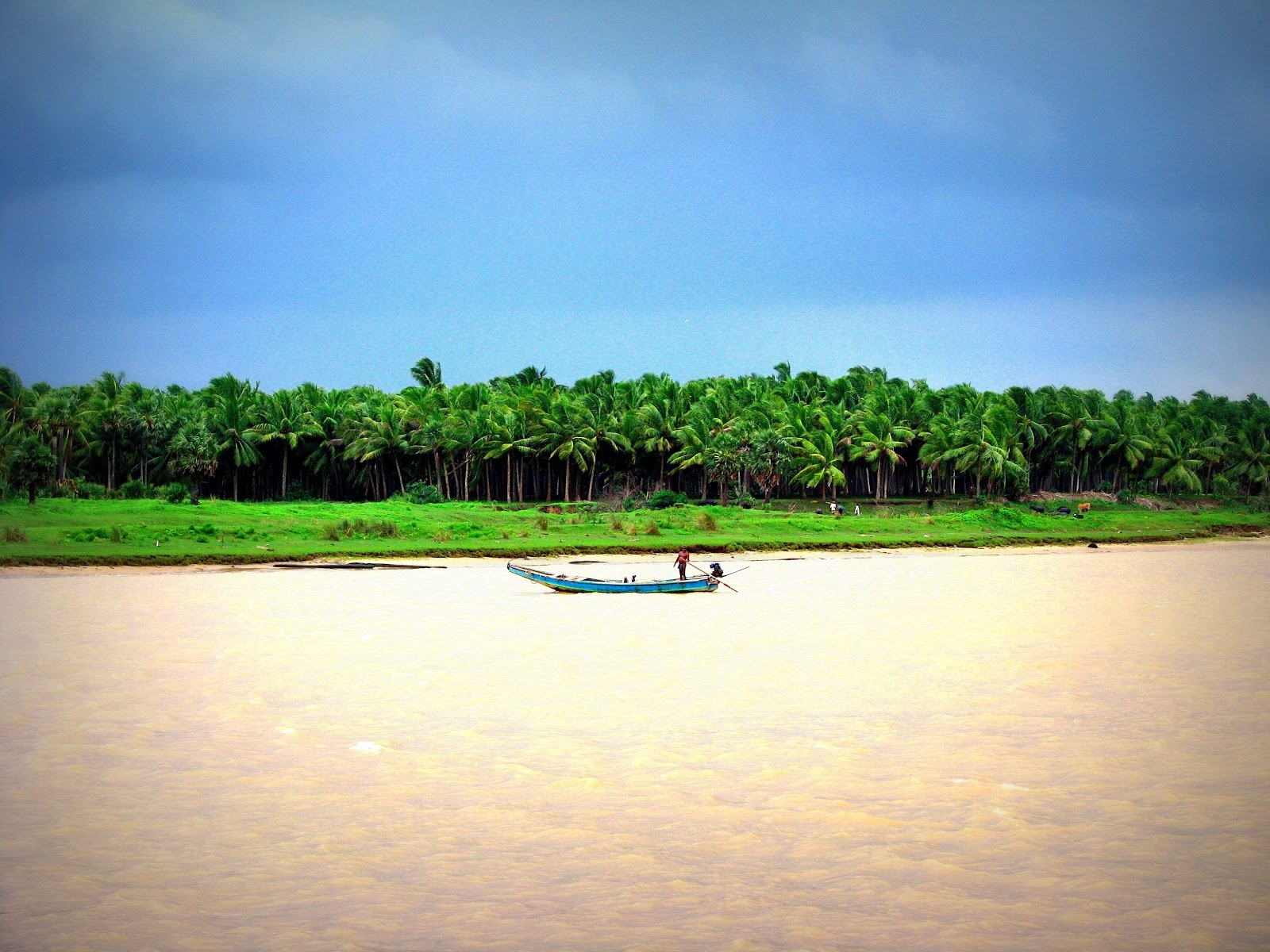
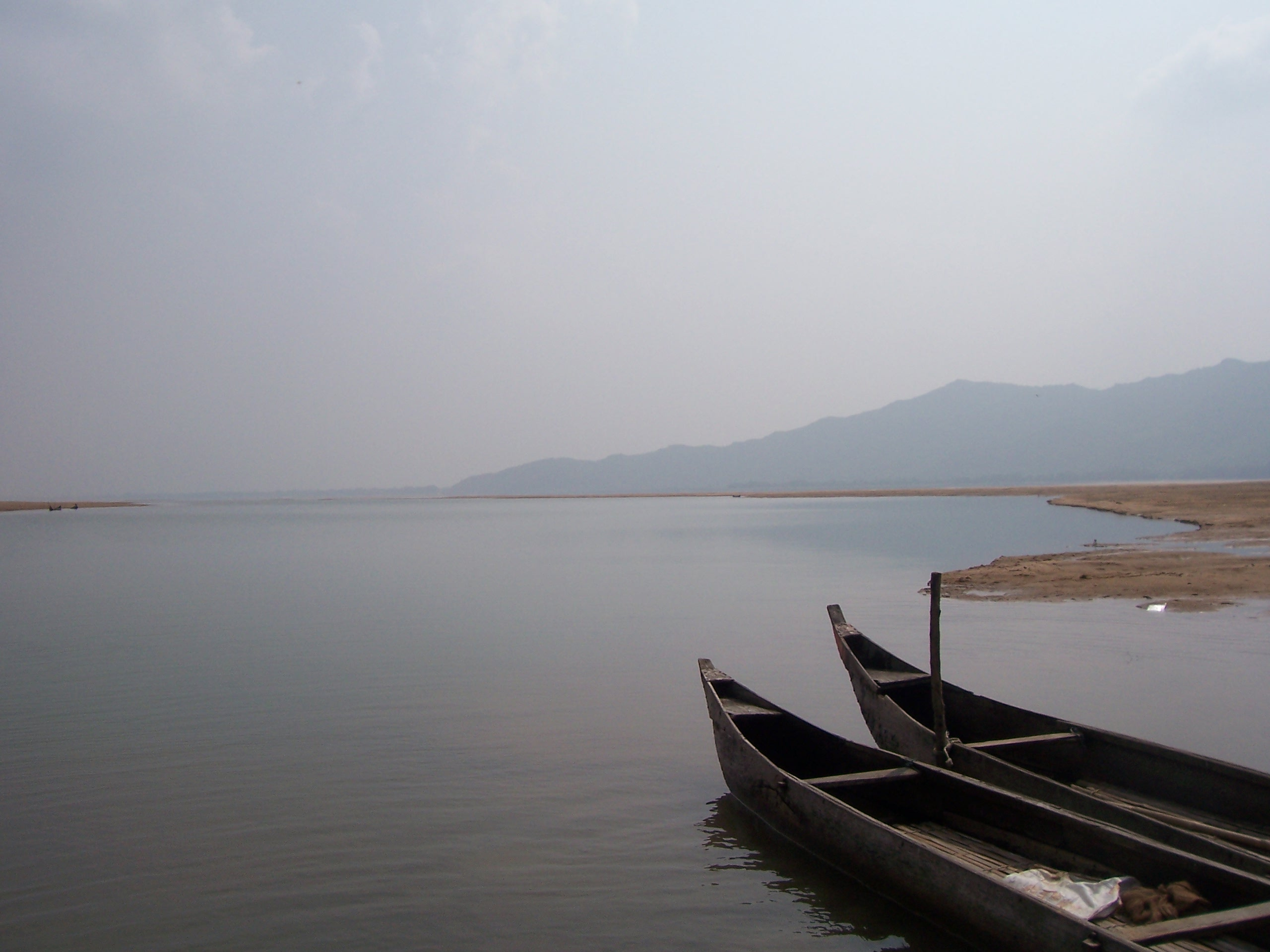
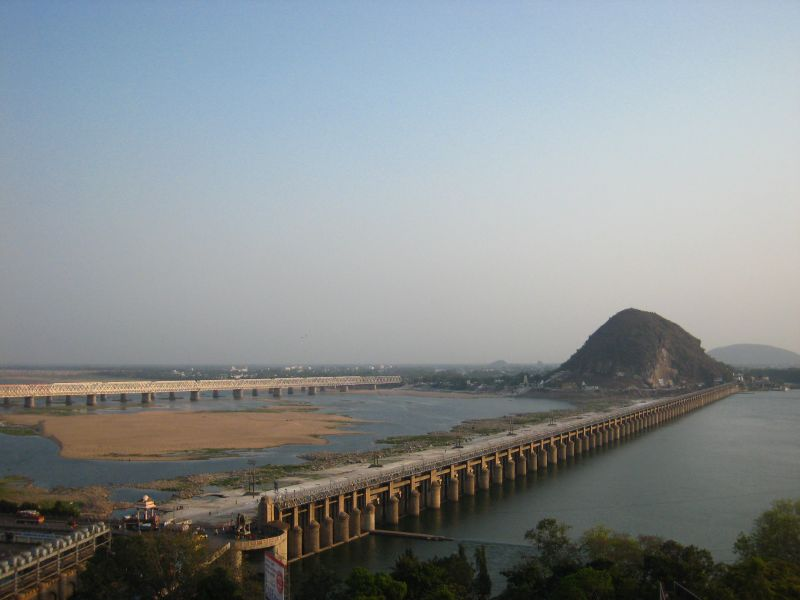
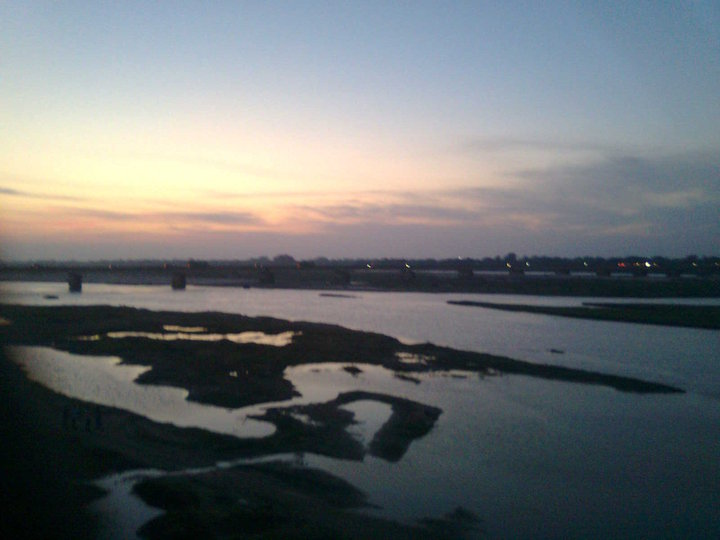
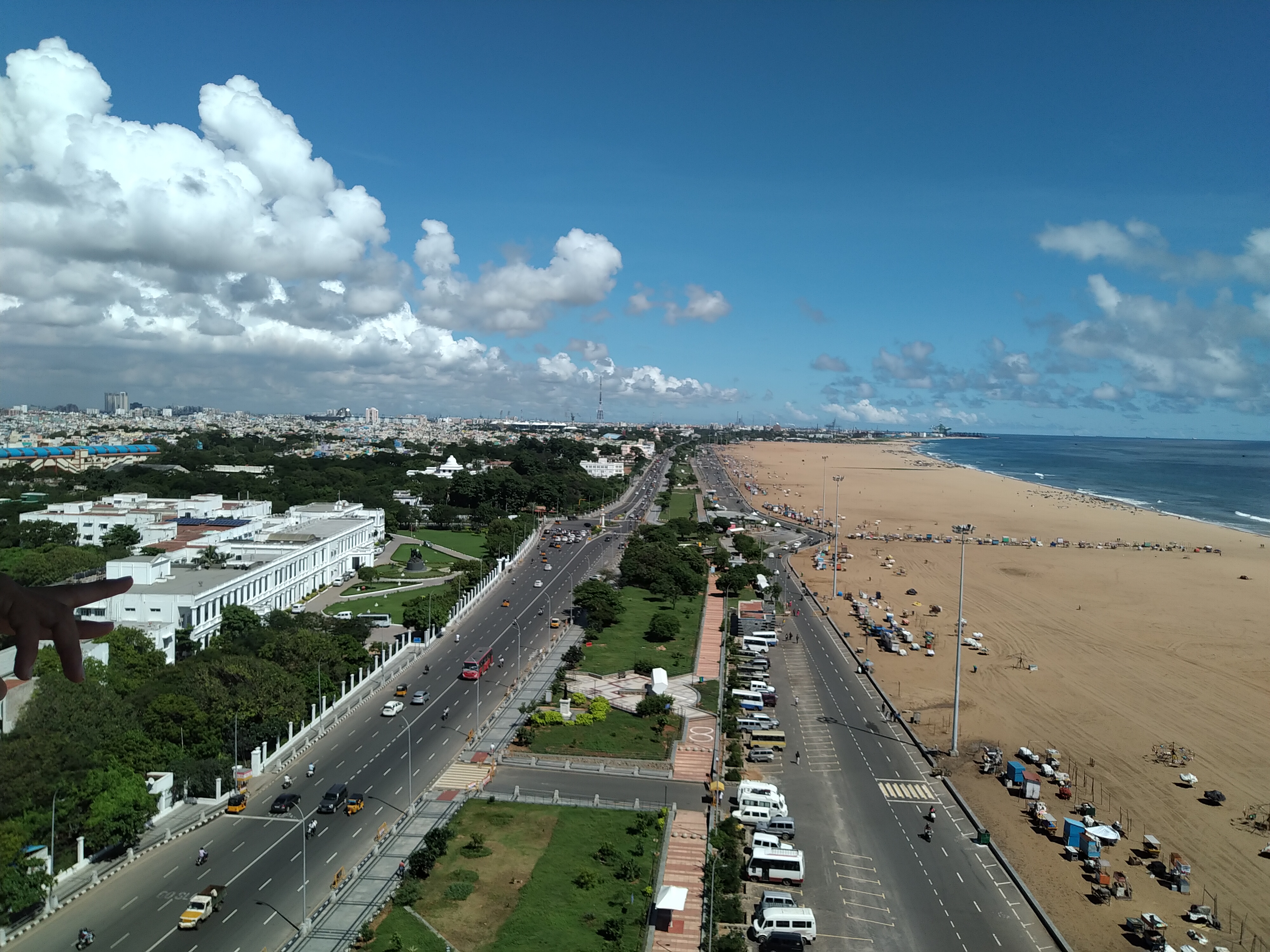
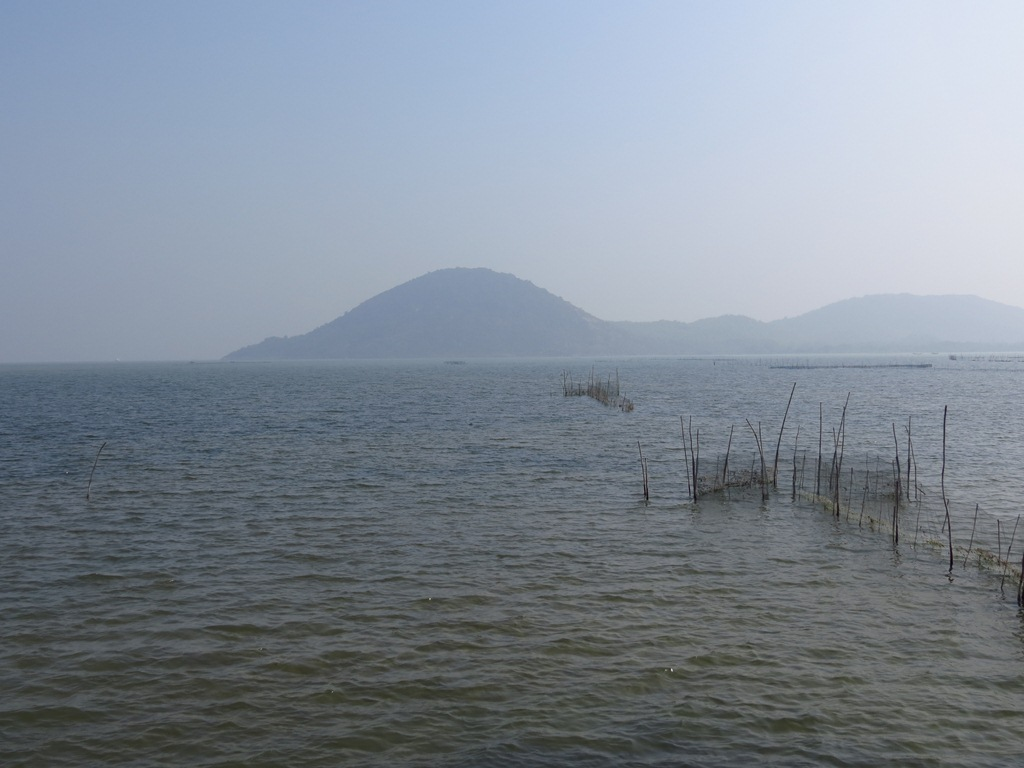
- Clockwise from top left: Godavari in Andhra plains; Mahanadi in Utkal Plains; Kaveri delta; Chilika Lake; Coromandel Coast in Chennai; Krishna River

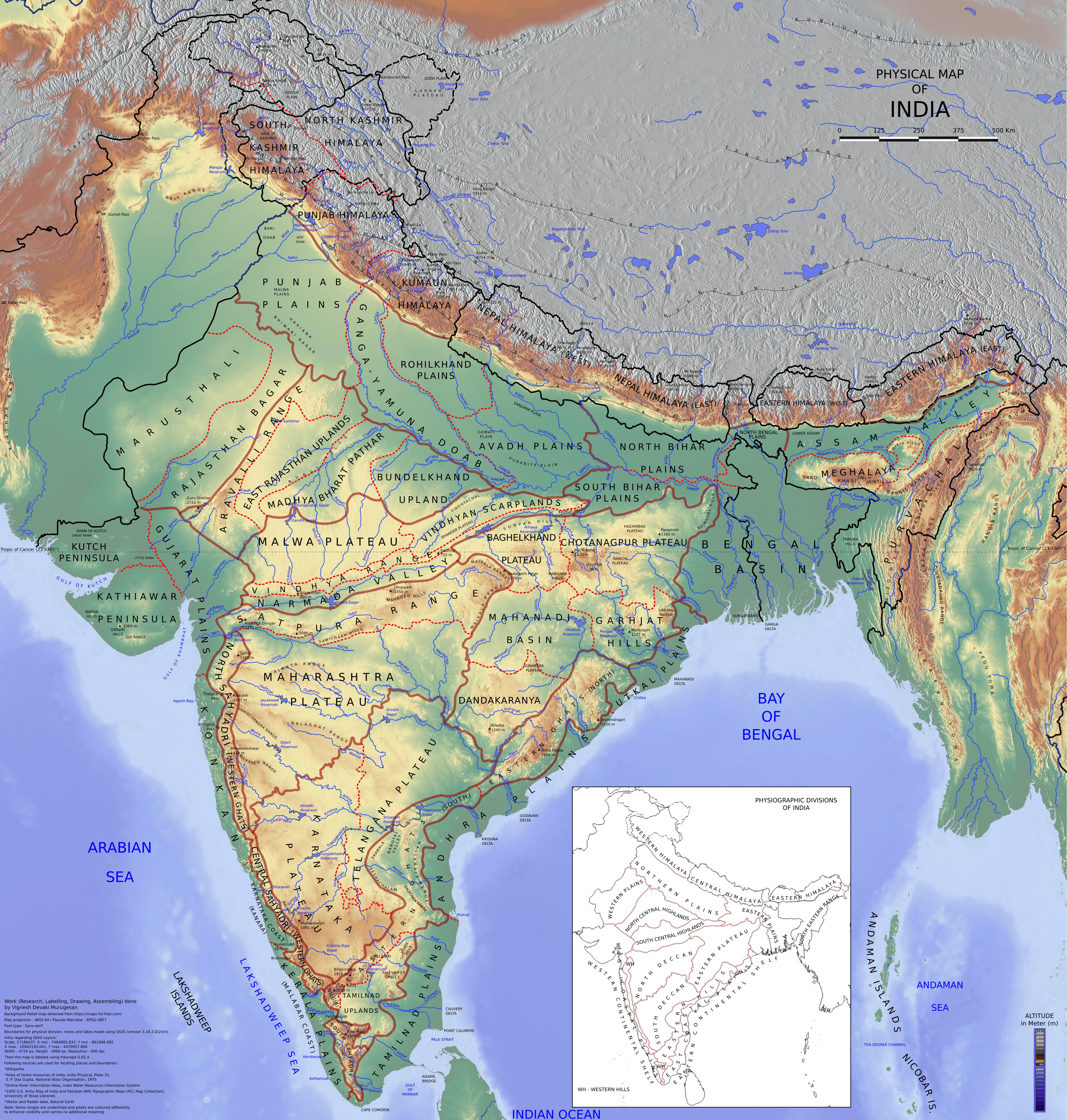
- Physical map of India, showing the various topographical regions
- Coordinates: 15°N 80°E
- Country: India
- State(s): Odisha; Andhra Pradesh; Tamil Nadu
- Largest city: Chennai

Languages
  - Major: Odia, Tamil, Telugu
- Time zone: Indian Standard Time

The Eastern Coastal Plains is a stretch of landmass lying between the eastern part of the Deccan Plateau and the Bay of Bengal in India. The plains stretch from the Mahanadi delta to Kaniyakumari at the southern tip of the Indian peninsula with the Eastern Ghats forming its rough western boundary. It is wider and leveled than the Western Coastal Plains and traverses the states of Odisha, Andhra Pradesh, and Tamil Nadu.

The plains are broadly divided into three subdivisions–Utkal Plains in the north, Andhra plains in the center, and Tamil Nadu plains in the south. The plains are fertile as it forms part of the deltas of major peninsular rivers such as Godavari, Krishna, Mahanadi, and Kaveri.

== Geography ==
The Eastern Coastal Plains is a stretch of coastal land lying between the eastern edge of the Deccan Plateau and the Bay of Bengal in the west. The disjointed mountain range of Eastern Ghats forms a rough western boundary of the plains. The plains stretch from the Mahanadi delta to Kaniyakumari at the southern tip of the Indian peninsula and traverses the states of Odisha, Andhra Pradesh, Tamil Nadu and the union territory of Puducherry. It is wider and leveled than the Western Coastal Plains and both the coastal plains meet at Kaniyakumari.

The average width of the plains vary between 35–200 km (22–124 mi) with an average width of 120 km (75 mi). The plains are broadly divided into three subdivisions–Utkal Plains in the north, Andhra plains (Circars) in the center, and Tamil Nadu plains (Coromandel) in the south.

== Utkal plains ==
The Utkal Plains form a major part of Odisha and stretch from the southern end of the Indo-Gangetic plains to the Andhra plains in the south. The region is drained by rivers such as Mahanadi, Brahmani, Baitarani, and Subarnarekha. The region consists of fertile red and black soil interspersed with gneiss and sandstone rock formations formed during the paleogene and neogene eras. The sands in the beaches consists of small granites and zircon. The vegetation consists of littoral forests on the coasts and tropical moist deciduous forests inland. Chilika Lake, the largest lake in the region is a brackish lagoon.

== Andhra plains ==
The Andhra Plains (Circars) extend from the south of the Utkal Plain to Pulicat Lake, north of Chennai. The coastal plains are widest in the region with a significant portion formed by the deltas of the largest peninsular rivers Godavari and Krishna. The two river deltas form a contiguous single physiographic unit and cut across a 160 km (99 mi) wide gorge in the Eastern Ghats. The deltas have advanced towards the Bay of Bengal, which has pushed the Kolleru Lake inwards. The Pulicat Lake is interrupted by a sand spit which forms the island of Sriharikota. The region is very fertile due to the aluvium deposited by the rivers and supports agriculture.

== Tamil Nadu plains ==
The Tamil Nadu Plains (Coromandel) stretches for 675 km (419 mi) from the south of Pulicat Lake to Kanniyakumari at the southern end of the Indian peninsula. The average width is about 100 km (62 mi) with the plains widest at the Kaveri delta at 130 km (81 mi). The fertile soil and irrigation facilities have made the Kaveri delta region as one of the major centers of agriculture. The coast itself has sparse vegetation with marshlands dotted with coconut and palm trees.

== See also ==
- Deccan Plateau
- Eastern Ghats
- Western Coastal Plains
