= List of tropical cyclones spawning tornadoes =

Intense tropical cyclones usually produce tornadoes, the majority of those weak, especially upon landfall.

== List of tornadoes ==
These are the tropical cyclones that are known to have spawned tornadoes. The list is most complete for the U.S., but does include other areas. Within the United States 1,163 tornadoes were associated with tropical cyclones, accounting for slightly under 6% of all tornadoes. The most tornadoes spawned by a single tropical cyclone were associated with Hurricane Ivan, which spawned 120 tornadoes.

=== Pre–1900 ===
Tropical cyclone	Outbreak dates	Tornadoes	Location of tornado(es)	Notes	Refs
Unnamed	September 10, 1811	1	South Carolina		
Unnamed	June 30, 1814	1	South Carolina		
Unnamed	September 10, 1882	*3	Florida		
Unnamed	October 4, 1885	*1	New Jersey		
Unnamed	October 11, 1885	*1	Florida		
Unnamed	July 6, 1891	*4	Louisiana, Mississippi		
Unnamed	September 13, 1892	*4	North Carolina, South Carolina		
1893 Sea Islands hurricane	August 28, 1893	*1	North Carolina		
Unnamed	September 7, 1893	*1	Louisiana		
Unnamed	October 4, 1899	*1	Georgia		

=== 1900–1949 ===
Tropical cyclone	Outbreak dates	Tornadoes	Location of tornado(es)	Notes	Refs
1900 Galveston hurricane	September 7, 1900	*2	Georgia		
Hurricane Four (1915)	September 4, 1915	*2	Georgia, Virginia		
1916 Gulf Coast hurricane	July 6, 1916	*11	Georgia, Alabama, Mississippi		
1916 Charleston hurricane	July 15, 1916	*1	South Carolina		
1916 Pensacola hurricane	October 18, 1916	*4	Alabama		
Unnamed	October 29, 1917	*4	South Carolina, Virginia		
1919 Florida Keys hurricane	September 10, 1919	*1	Florida		
1919 Florida Keys hurricane	September 15, 1919	2	Texas, New Mexico		
Hurricane Two (1921)	September 9, 1921	*6	Texas		
1928 Haiti hurricane	August 10, 1928	*5	South Carolina		
1928 Haiti hurricane	August 15, 1928	*4	South Carolina, North Carolina		
1929 Bahamas hurricane	September 28, 1929	*6	Florida, South Carolina		
1933 Treasure Coast hurricane	September 6, 1933	1	South Carolina		
1933 Cuba–Bahamas hurricane	October 4, 1933	*2	Florida		
Hurricane Three (1934)	July 24, 1934	*8	Texas		
1935 Labor Day hurricane	September 4, 1935	*13	South Carolina, North Carolina, Virginia, Maryland		
Hurricane Three (1938)	August 15, 1938	*1	Louisiana		
1940 South Carolina hurricane	August 10, 1940	2	South Carolina		
Tropical Storm Six (1941)	October 20, 1941	*2	Florida		
1944 Cuba–Florida hurricane	October 18, 1944	3	Florida		
1945 Texas hurricane	August 27, 1945	*2	Texas	F3 killed one and injured 15 in Houston	
1945 Homestead hurricane	September 17, 1945	*1	South Carolina		
1947 Fort Lauderdale hurricane	September 19, 1947	*1	Florida	F3 killed two and injured 100 in Apalachicola	
1947 Florida–Georgia hurricane	October 11, 1947	*4	Florida		
Hurricane Five (1948)	September 4, 1948	1	Georgia, Florida		
September 1948 Florida hurricane	September 21, 1948	*1	Florida		
1948 Miami hurricane	October 5, 1948	*3	Florida		
1949 Florida hurricane	August 28, 1949	*4	North Carolina		
1949 Texas hurricane	October 3, 1949	1	Texas		-

=== 1950–1979 ===
Tropical cyclone	Outbreak dates	Tornadoes	Location of tornado(es)	Notes	Refs
Hurricane Baker	August 30–31, 1950	2	Texas		
Hurricane Able	August 31, 1952	3	Virginia, North Carolina, Maryland		
Hurricane Connie	August 10, 1955	4	South Carolina, North Carolina, Delaware		
Hurricane Diane	August 19, 1955	*1	Pennsylvania		
Hurricane Flossy	September 24, 1956	*5	Florida, Georgia, South Carolina		
Hurricane Audrey	June 27, 1957	*21	Mississippi, Alabama, Louisiana, Tennessee		
Hurricane Cindy	July 10, 1959	11	North Carolina, Virginia, Maryland, Georgia		
Hurricane Debra	July 24, 1959	5	Oklahoma, Texas		
Hurricane Gracie	September 29, 1959	7	South Carolina, North Carolina, Virginia, Pennsylvania		
Hurricane Judith	October 17, 1959	1	Florida		
Hurricane Donna	September 10, 1960	5	Virginia, North Carolina, South Carolina		
Hurricane Ethel	September 15, 1960	6	Florida, Alabama		
Hurricane Carla	September 10, 1961	21	Texas, Louisiana, Georgia, Michigan, Arkansas	F4 killed 8 in Galveston, Texas vicinity; one of only two hurricane-spawned violent tornado	
Hurricane Cleo	August 27, 1964	12	Florida, South Carolina, North Carolina		
Hurricane Dora	September 12, 1964	3	South Carolina, North Carolina		
Hurricane Hilda	October 3, 1964	12	Louisiana, Mississippi, Alabama, North Carolina	F4 killed 22 in Larose, Louisiana vicinity; one of only two hurricane-spawned violent tornado	
Hurricane Isbell	October 14, 1964	9	Florida		
Hurricane Betsy	September 8, 1965	7	Florida, Alabama, Mississippi		
Hurricane Alma	June 8, 1966	5	Florida, Mississippi		
Hurricane Inez	October 4, 1966	2	Florida		
Hurricane Beulah	September 20, 1967	115	Texas, Mexico	Second most tornadoes spawned by a tropical cyclone	
Hurricane Abby	June 7, 1968	4	North Carolina		
Hurricane Gladys	October 17, 1968	2	Florida		
Hurricane Camille	August 17, 1969	2	Florida		
Hurricane Celia	August 31, 1970	9	Texas		
Hurricane Edith	September 16, 1971	16	Louisiana, Alabama, Mississippi		
Hurricane Fern	September 10, 1971	5	Texas		
Hurricane Agnes	June 18, 1972	17	Florida, Georgia		
Hurricane Carmen	September 8, 1974	4	Louisiana		
Hurricane Eloise	September 23, 1975	5	Georgia, Florida		
Hurricane Babe	September 5, 1977	14	Louisiana, South Carolina, Mississippi, Alabama		
Hurricane David	September 3, 1979	34	Florida, Maryland, Virginia, Pennsylvania, Delaware		
Hurricane Frederic	September 12, 1979	10	Alabama, Georgia, Florida		

=== 1980–1999 ===
Tropical cyclone	Date of (first) tornado	Tornadoes	Area affected	Notes	Refs
Hurricane Allen	August 9, 1980	*29	Texas	Costliest tropical cyclone–related tornado in history struck Austin, Texas vicinity inflicting $100 million in damages	
T. D. #2	June 5, 1981	9	Louisiana, Texas		
Hurricane Dennis	August 17, 1981	2	Florida		
T. D. #8	August 31, 1981	14	Texas		
Hurricane Alicia	August 17, 1983	*22	Texas		
Hurricane Diana	September 5, 1984	1	Florida		
Hurricane Danny	August 15, 1985	*39	Louisiana, Mississippi, Tennessee, Alabama, South Carolina, Georgia		
Hurricane Elena	August 31, 1985	10	Florida		
Typhoon Tess (Miling)	September 3, 1985	1	Lemery, Batangas, Philippines		
Hurricane Gloria	September 27, 1985	2	New Jersey, Massachusetts		
Hurricane Juan	October 28, 1985	11	Florida, Alabama, Mississippi		
Hurricane Bonnie	June 27, 1986	5	Louisiana		
Hurricane Gilbert	September 16, 1988	*29+	Texas, Mexico		
Typhoon Ruby (Unsang)	October 23, 1988	1	Misamis Oriental, Philippines		
Hurricane Chantal	August 1, 1989	4	Texas		
Typhoon Sarah (Openg)	September 9–10, 1989	2	Luzon, Philippines		
Hurricane Hugo	September 22, 1989	3	South Carolina, North Carolina		
Hurricane Jerry	October 15, 1989	5	Texas		
Hurricane Bob	August 18, 1991	5	North Carolina, New York		
Tropical Storm Beryl (1994)	August 16–17, 1994	37	Carolinas, Georgia, Mid Atlantic		
Hurricane Georges	September 1998	47	Alabama, Georgia, Florida		
Hurricane Floyd	September 16, 1999	14+	North Carolina		

=== 2000–2009 ===
Tropical cyclone	Date of (first) tornado	Tornadoes	Area affected	Notes	Refs
Hurricane Gordon	September 16, 2000	11	Florida, North Carolina, South Carolina		
Tropical Storm Helene	September 22, 2000	13	Florida, Georgia, South Carolina		
Hurricane Keith	October 6, 2000	1	Texas		
Tropical Storm Allison	June 11, 2001	28	Florida, Alabama, Georgia, Louisiana, Mississippi, South Carolina, Virginia, Massachusetts, Maine, Texas		
Tropical Storm Barry	August 2, 2001	5	Florida, Mississippi, Missouri		
Tropical Storm Gabrielle	September 13, 2001	18	Florida		
Hurricane Michelle	November 5, 2001	5	Florida		
Typhoon Lingling (Nanang)	November 6, 2001	1	Camiguin, Philippines		
Tropical Storm Fay	September 6, 2002	11	Texas		
Hurricane Gustav	September 10, 2002	1	North Carolina		
Tropical Storm Hanna	September 14, 2002	2	Alabama, Georgia		
Hurricane Isidore	September 25, 2002	10	Alabama, Florida, Louisiana		
Hurricane Lili	October 3, 2002	26	Alabama, Mississippi, Louisiana, Kentucky		
Hurricane Kyle	October 8, 2002	8	South Carolina, North Carolina		
Hurricane Charley	August 13, 2004	16	Florida, North Carolina, Virginia		
Hurricane Gaston	August 29, 2004	33			
Hurricane Frances	September 4–8, 2004	103*	Florida, Georgia, South Carolina, North Carolina, Virginia	Third most tornadoes spawned by a tropical cyclone	
Hurricane Ivan	September 16, 2004	120	United States Gulf Coast and Mid-Atlantic Coast	Most tornadoes spawned by a tropical cyclone worldwide, a record for a tornado outbreak in the month of September.	
Tropical Storm Arlene	June 11, 2005	3	Florida, Indiana		
Hurricane Cindy	July 5, 2005	44	Southeastern United States		
Hurricane Dennis	July 10, 2005	10	Florida and Georgia		
Hurricane Emily	July 20, 2005	11	Texas		
Hurricane Katrina	August 25, 2005	59	United States Gulf Coast	Record tornado outbreak in the month of August.	
Hurricane Rita	September 24, 2005	98	United States Gulf Coast		
Tropical Storm Tammy	October 6, 2005	1	Georgia, United States		
Hurricane Wilma	October 24, 2005	8	Florida		
Tropical Storm Alberto	June 12, 2006	17	Southeastern United States		
Hurricane Ernesto	August 24, 2006	5	Florida and North Carolina, United States		
Tropical Storm Barry	June 1–2, 2007	4	Cuba, Florida, United States		
Tropical Storm Erin	August 16, 2007	7	Texas, Oklahoma, and Louisiana United States		
Hurricane Humberto	September 12, 2007	1	Louisiana, United States		
Typhoon Wipha (Goring)	September 17, 2007	1	Bacolod, Negros Occidental, Philippines		
Tropical Depression Ten	September 20, 2007	2	Florida, United States		
Tropical Storm Olga	December 16, 2007	2	Florida, United States		
Typhoon Fengshen (Frank)	June 21, 2008	1	Sagay, Negros Occidental, Philippines		
Hurricane Dolly	July 23–24, 2008	6	Texas, United States		
Tropical Storm Fay	August 18–27, 2008	50	South-eastern United States		
Hurricane Gustav	August 31, 2008	49	United States Gulf Coast		
Hurricane Hanna	September 6, 2008	1	Pennsylvania and Virginia		
Hurricane Ike	September 9, 2008	33	United States Gulf Coast		
Tropical Storm Nangka (Feria)	June 23, 2009	2	Perez, Quezon and Can-avid, Eastern Samar, Philippines		

=== 2010–2019 ===
Tropical cyclone	Outbreak dates	Tornadoes	Location of tornado(es)	Refs
Hurricane Alex	June 30 – July 2, 2010	11	Texas, United States	
Tropical Storm Hermine	September 7–9, 2010	13	Southern United States	
Cyclone Carlos	February 22, 2011	4	Karratha, Australia	
Tropical Storm Arlene	June 30, 2011	1	Texas, United States	
Hurricane Irene	August 26, 2011	9	United States East Coast	
Tropical Storm Lee	September 3–7, 2011	46	Southeastern United States	
Typhoon Son-Tinh	October 25, 2012	5	Quezon, Philippines	
Hurricane Rina	October 29, 2011	2	Florida, United States	
Tropical Storm Beryl	May 28–30, 2012	4	Southeastern United States	
Tropical Storm Debby	June 23–27, 2012	25	Florida, United States	
Hurricane Isaac	August 21 – September 1, 2012	32	Southeastern, Midwestern, and Eastern United States	
Typhoon Sanba (Karen)	September 18, 2012	Several	Japan	
Hurricane Sandy	October 28, 2012	1	Bermuda	
Cyclone Evan	December 2012	Several	Samoa	
Typhoon Bopha	December 4, 2012	1	Alicia, Zamboanga Sibugay, Philippines	
Cyclone Oswald	January 17–29, 2013	Several	Queensland, Australia	
Tropical Storm Andrea	June 5–7, 2013	16	Cuba, Florida, North Carolina	
Tropical Storm Bebinca (Fabian)	June 20, 2013	2	Palawan and Occidental Mindoro, Philippines	
Severe Tropical Storm Rumbia (Gorio)	June 29, 2013	1	Jomalig, Quezon, Philippines	
Severe Tropical Storm Toraji	September 4, 2013	3	Japan	
Typhoon Man-yi	September 15–16, 2013	10	Japan	
Tropical Depression Wilma	November 4, 2013	2	Metro Cebu and Metro Iloilo, Philippines	
Typhoon Haiyan (Yolanda)	November 8, 2013	1	Jagna, Bohol, Philippines	
Typhoon Kalmaegi (Luis)	September 12, 2014	1	Parang, Maguindanao del Norte, Philippines	
Tropical Storm Cindy	June 22, 2017	18	Florida, Alabama, Mississippi, Kentucky, West Virginia, Pennsylvania, New Jersey	
Tropical Storm Emily	July 31, 2017	18	Florida, Alabama, Mississippi, Kentucky, West Virginia, Pennsylvania, New Jersey	
Hurricane Harvey	August 25 – September 1, 2017	52	Texas, Louisiana, Mississippi, Alabama, Tennessee	
Tropical Storm Philippe	October 28–29, 2017	2	Florida	
Typhoon Damrey	November 4, 2017	3	Vietnam	
Tropical Storm Kai-tak (Urduja)	December 16, 2017	1	Caibiran, Biliran, Philippines	
Tropical Storm Alberto	May 31, 2018	4	Florida, South Carolina, Ohio	
Tropical Storm Gordon	September 5–8, 2018	7	Mississippi, Kentucky, Indiana	
Hurricane Florence	September 13–17, 2018	44	North Carolina, Virginia, South Carolina	
Typhoon Mangkhut (Ompong)	September 14, 2018	1	Marikina, Metro Manila, Philippines	
Hurricane Michael	October 10, 2018	16	Florida, Georgia, South Carolina, Virginia	
Hurricane Dorian	September 5–6, 2019	20	North Carolina, South Carolina	
Typhoon Hagibis	October 12, 2019	1	Ichihara, Chiba Prefecture, Japan	
Tropical Storm Nestor	October 19, 2019	3	Florida	
Typhoon Phanfone (Ursula)	December 25, 2019	1	Calapan, Oriental Mindoro, Philippines	

=== 2020–present ===
Tropical cyclone	Outbreak dates	Tornadoes	Location of tornado(es)	Refs
Severe Tropical Cyclone Harold	April 8, 2020	Several	Fiji	
Tropical Storm Cristobal	June 6, 2020	13	Florida, Illinois, Ohio	
Tropical Storm Fay	July 11, 2020	1	Maine	
Hurricane Hanna	July 26, 2020	5	Texas	
Hurricane Isaias	August 3–4, 2020	39	East Coast of the United States	
Hurricane Laura	August 27–28, 2020	16	Gulf Coast of the United States	
Hurricane Sally	September 16–18, 2020	23	Southern United States	
Subtropical Storm Alpha	September 18, 2020	2	Portugal	
Tropical Storm Beta	September 25, 2020	1	South Carolina	
Hurricane Delta	October 8–11, 2020	14	Southern United States	
Cyclone Yaas	May 25, 2021	2	West Bengal	
Tropical Storm Claudette	June 19–20, 2021	9	Southern United States	
Hurricane Elsa	July 6–9, 2021	17	East Coast of the United States	
Tropical Storm Fred	August 17–19, 2021	30	East Coast of the United States	
Hurricane Ida	August 29–September 2, 2021	29	Southeastern to Mid-Atlantic to Northeastern United States	
Tropical Storm Alex	June 3, 2022	2	Cuba	
Typhoon Chaba (Caloy)	June 28, 2022	3	Shantou, Chaozhou, and Foshan	
Hurricane Ian	September 27–28, 2022	15	Florida, North Carolina	
Typhoon Doksuri (Egay)	July 24, 2023	1	Vinzons, Camarines Norte, Philippines	
Hurricane Idalia	August 30, 2023	12	Florida	
Typhoon Ewiniar (Aghon)	May 25–27, 2024	2	Lavezares, Northern Samar and Arayat, Pampanga, Philippines	
Hurricane Beryl	July 8–10, 2024	71	Texas, Louisiana, Arkansas, Kentucky, Indiana, New York, Ontario	
Hurricane Debby	August 4–8, 2024	24	Florida, South Carolina, North Carolina, Virginia, West Virginia, Delaware	
Hurricane Helene	September 25–27, 2024	31	Southeastern to Mid-Atlantic United States.	
Hurricane Milton	October 9–10, 2024	45	Florida	
Typhoon Man-yi (Pepito)	November 17, 2024	1	Aparri and Pamplona, Cagayan, Philippines	
Typhoon Kajiki (Isang)	August 25–26, 2025	6	Vietnam	
Tropical Storm Peipah (Kiko)	September 9, 2025	1	Shizuoka Prefecture, Japan	
Typhoon Ragasa (Nando)	September 22–24, 2025	5	Ilocos Sur, Zambales, Bulacan, Philippines and Taitung County, Taiwan	
Typhoon Bualoi (Opong)	September 25–29, 2025	29	Calapan, Baco, Oriental Mindoro, Philippines, and Zhanjiang, China, Vietnam	
Typhoon Koto (Verbena)	November 25–26, 2025	2	Labangan, Zamboanga del Sur and Tangalan, Aklan, Philippines	
Tropical Depression Wilma (2025)	December 7, 2025	1	Mercedes, Camarines Norte, Philippines	
Tropical Storm Penha (Basyang)	February 6, 2026	1	Panglao, Bohol, Philippines	
Tropical Storm Jangmi (Domeng)	May 31, 2026	1	Infanta, Quezon, Philippines	
Tropical Storm Maysak (Henry)	July 4–7, 2026	10	Guangxi, Guangdong, Hubei, Anhui, Jiangsu, China	
Typhoon Bavi (Inday)	July 11–12, 2026	2	Nabas, Aklan, Santa Cruz, Occidental Mindoro, Philippines	

== See also ==
- Lists of Atlantic hurricanes
- List of tornadoes and tornado outbreaks
- List of F5, EF5, and IF5 tornadoes
- List of F4, EF4, and IF4 tornadoes
  - List of F4 and EF4 tornadoes (2000–2009)
  - List of F4 and EF4 tornadoes (2010–2019)
  - List of F4, EF4, and IF4 tornadoes (2020–present)
