= Miami tornado =

Miami tornado may refer to:

- The 1925 Miami tornado, the deadliest ever to strike Miami-Dade County, Florida
- The 1997 Miami tornado, an F1 tornado which touched down in Miami, Florida
- The Miami tornadoes of 2003
