= 1925 Miami tornado =

Severe weather event in South Florida

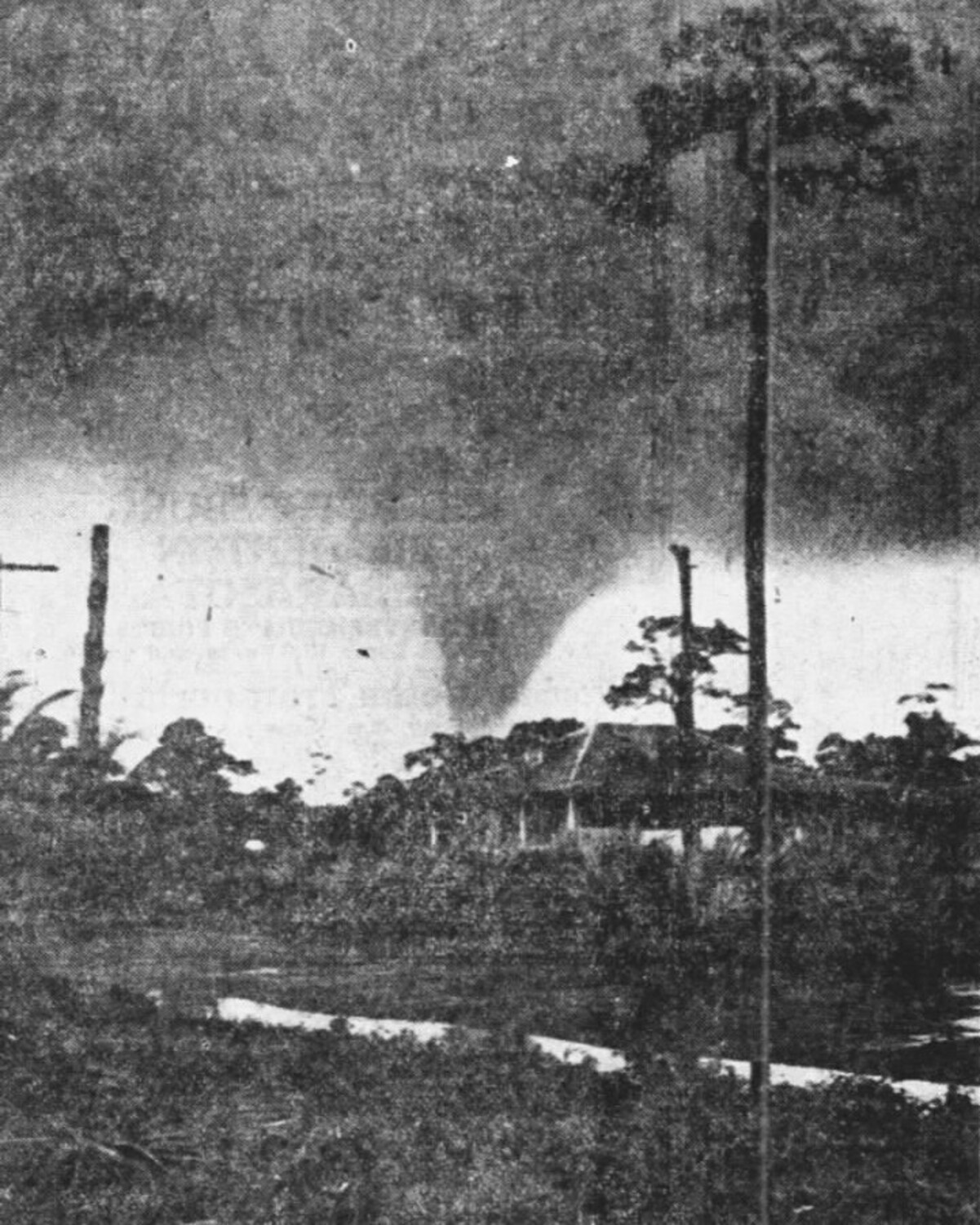
- The tornado as seen from the southwest

Meteorological history
- Formed: April 5, 1925, 1:00 p.m. EST (UTC−05:00)
- Dissipated: April 5, 1925, 2:00 p.m. EST (UTC−05:00)

F3 equiv. tornado
- Max width: ~440 yards (400 m)
- Path length: 12 miles (19 km)

Satellite tornadoes
- Tornadoes: 3
- Max. rating: FU tornado

Overall effects
- Fatalities: 5
- Injuries: 35
- Damage: $250,000 ($4,590,000 in 2025 USD) (Note: All losses are in 1925 United States dollars unless otherwise noted.)
- Areas affected: Hialeah; northern Miami; Little River; Biscayne Park; Arch Creek, Dade County, Florida
- Part of the tornadoes and tornado outbreaks of 1925

On Sunday, April 5, 1925, an intense tornado hit the northern edge of Miami in South Florida, killing five people and injuring 35. The deadliest tornado to affect Dade County, it was rated F3 on the Fujita scale (Note: A group of scientists under Ted Fujita invented the scale in the early 1970s, prior to which no official rating method existed in the United States. Events that arose before the use of the scale by the National Weather Service gained ratings in hindsight. While since replaced in the U.S. by the Enhanced Fujita scale as of February 1, 2007, it was in use in Canada until April 1, 2013; other nations, including the United Kingdom, employ alternate schemes such as the TORRO scale.)—one of only two such tornadoes recorded with that intensity. (Note: Tornadoes in the United States were unrated before 1971. Ratings were retroactively applied to events prior to the formal adoption of the F-scale by the National Weather Service. While official ratings extended back to 1950, tornado expert Thomas P. Grazulis rated older events.) It was one of a select few Florida tornadoes to claim three or more lives. About 200 yd (180 m) wide, (Note: For the width the average/mean is used. Most tornado widths listed from 1952–1994 are mean values, whereas maxima are used in contemporary years. Data given by Grazulis are approximate averages (i.e., 0.5 mi (0.80 km) is adjusted from 880 yards to 800 yards).) it formed over the Everglades near Hialeah and moved northeast, toward the Atlantic Ocean, destroying about 75 homes, with losses of $250,000. Over 500 people lost their homes, and five fatalities were reported, along with 35 injuries. The first tornado seen by weather officials in Miami since 1919, it coexisted with at least three satellite tornadoes and may have been a tornado family. Huge hail accompanied the tornado as well.

== Climatological background ==
Tornadoes are more densely packed in Florida than any other U.S. state, as shown by rates per 10,000 mi^{2} (26,000 km^{2}). Most are weak, brief, thin, and rarely fatal, causing fewer deaths than their amount or human population imply. Only 0.7% attain the strongest, or violent (E/F4+), tier, versus 2.7% in Tornado Alley. Strong (E/F2+) or intense (E/F3+) events rarely hit South Florida, tending to favor robust El Niño years, due to elevated front and cyclone activity inducing wintertime storminess. (Note: The Florida dry season (November–April) corresponds to winter.) Conversely, in 1925 La Niña was ongoing. Deadly Florida tornadoes usually occur in outbreaks, or clusters, (Note: Outbreaks involve at least four to six tornadoes within defined timescales, often six-hour increments, though numbers vary by region. In Florida the lower bound fixes an outbreak, using four-hour intervals.) whereas the 1925 tornado formed singly. Apart from a hurricane-borne tornado in 1919, (Note: The 1919 event was retroactively rated F2 on the Fujita scale by tornado historian Thomas P. Grazulis and caused no deaths.) it was also first tornado in Miami or its environs to be noted by the Weather Bureau since it opened a local office in 1911. However, many fewer tornadoes, mainly weak, were likely verified before 1950, due to lower population densities. Large tracts of South Florida, notably the Everglades, are still thinly settled, but with rising tornado reports over time due to more people and remote sensors used to plot tornadoes, such as modern weather radar.

== Meteorological synopsis ==
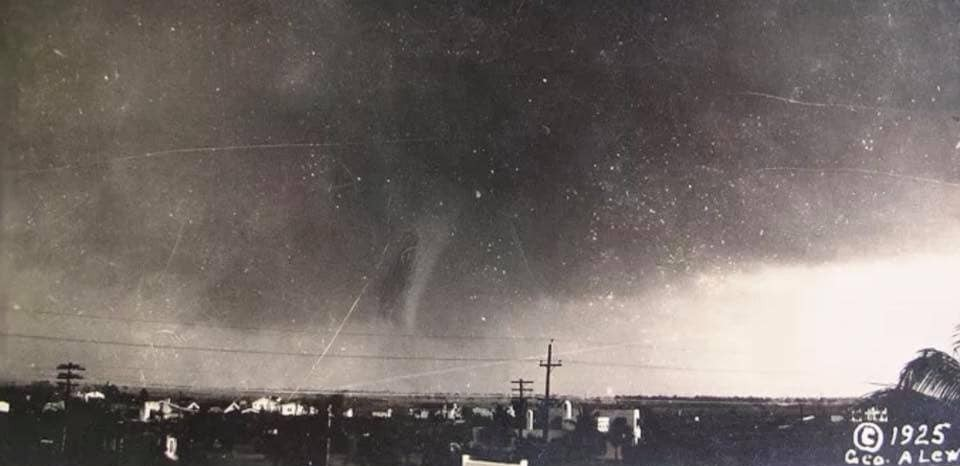
The tornado shortly after formation

The catalyst for the tornado lay in a low-pressure area traceable to northern California that crossed the Southern United States in early April, reaching Florida's First Coast with rains over a wide swath on April 5. A potent thunderstorm formed near Homestead, 30 mi (48 km) below Miami, and slid northeastward, hitting nearby towns such as Goulds, Perrine, Florida City, and Princeton. Heavy rains fell in its path, with loud thunder and vivid lightning signaling its arrival. Around 12:50 p.m. local time, players at a golf links in Hialeah noticed unique, rotary cloud motions, depicted as a turbulent, clashing mass. About 10 minutes later, a cone-like funnel cloud descended on the course, preceded by baseball-sized hail. Weather Bureau official Richard W. Gray traced its origin to the Everglades, as did other observers including Hialeah Herald editor J. W. Wendler. The storm seemingly emerged along an outflow boundary within the prevailing air flow, as shown by station data from Miami. It tracked as far as Fort Lauderdale, striking the communities of Hialeah, Lemon City, Little River, Biscayne Park, and Ojus. Attendant hail lasted 10–15 minutes, coating the ground with fist-sized stones in places such as Miami Shores.

== Tornado summary ==
I saw the roof of a building over by the golf course lifted straight into the air and carried at least 200 feet away. There was a terrific bang, as if there had been an explosion inside the house. It was as if a huge high-speed derrick had slung the roof off.

— Arthur Pryor

Tornadogenesis took place over the Hialeah municipal golf course near 1:00 p.m. Writing in the Monthly Weather Review, Gray noted that it resembled a "very slender cone extending in a straight line" from cloud to ground. The tornado first unroofed a shed, hurled a few trucks, and snagged a clubhouse post. Pieces of the roof were found 300 yd (270 m) away, and a mule was fatally blown into the side of its pen. A roller and wagons were tossed onto fairways. Flying debris injured a caddy, but not gravely. Heading northeast, the tornado tore stables, roofs, and shrubbery. As it swirled past, many thousand people swarmed the area in vehicles to approach the slow-moving funnel, piqued by its high visibility and threatening skies. Due to heavy traffic, multiple vehicle collisions occurred. Seen around for miles, the tornado averaged 20 mph (32 km/h) at times, with an erratic, undulating motion that kindled rumors of multiple tornado. Up to four tornadoes were alleged, with as many as seven funnel sightings. A waterspout formed on Biscayne Bay at the same time as the tornado. The tornado repeatedly skipped, damaging scattered areas. One area was near the Miami Canal, where the tornado seemed to unravel and redevelop.

Tornado deaths
Name	Age	Source(s)
F. E. ("Red") Sullivan	35	
John Watson Simpson	8	
Mathilda Schultz	70	
Mrs. John T. Simpson	—N/a	
Unknown	—N/a	

It then hit the White Belt Dairy, the state's biggest in 1925. Most casualties ensued there, along with losses over $200,000, the worst in the storm area. Heavy debris, such as lumber, was churned up over a 1/2-mile (0.80 km) radius by swirling winds, turning the farm into a "scrambled mess of everything", according to the Miami Herald. Furniture, utensils, and woodchips cluttered the ground. Vehicles were mangled and tossed up to 1/4 mi (0.40 km) away; listed as totaled were five cars and 10 motor trucks. Fierce winds leveled a mess hall, an apartment, and four frame homes. A barn roof was partly peeled off, and another barn sustained damage. Three cows were airborne for 50 ft (15 m) at a height of 15 ft (4.6 m) but survived uninjured. Five others went missing, two died of wounds, and two more were so badly maimed that they were shot. Flying debris fatally hospitalized a woman, and other people suffered severe injuries. A police cordon kept away hundreds of gawkers. Wrapped in smoky debris clouds, the tornado halted briefly at the dairy, then resumed its course. A nearby restaurant was leveled, killing a man, and a cookstove was tossed 100 yd (91 m).

Wreckage at the White Belt Dairy after the tornado

The tornado then hit Elizabeth Park, leveling roughly 10 homes, leaving homesites bare, and killing hundreds of chickens. One house lost its combination roof and garage. A dozen more homes were destroyed in nearby Hillside Acres, with only three others intact. Multiple homes were carried at least 300 ft (91 m), along with a barn. Near Little River, the tornado flattened a large, vacant frame home and the Westwood Inn, killing two people at the inn. One other death occurred nearby. Six other homes were struck as well, one of which was tossed into another house, shattering a brick wall. As it crossed northern Miami, the funnel widened to about 1/4 mi (0.40 km), becoming rain-obscured over time. In Biscayne Park, it destroyed three homes and damaged a few automobiles. A newly-built, two-story stucco home lost most of its walls, and large roof pieces were entangled in trees. The tornado also uprooted large trees. After destroying some power poles, the tornado moved out over Biscayne Bay near Arch Creek and was no longer sighted. Its 12-mile (19 km) path lasted about an hour, with a mean width of 200 yd (180 m).

== Aftermath ==
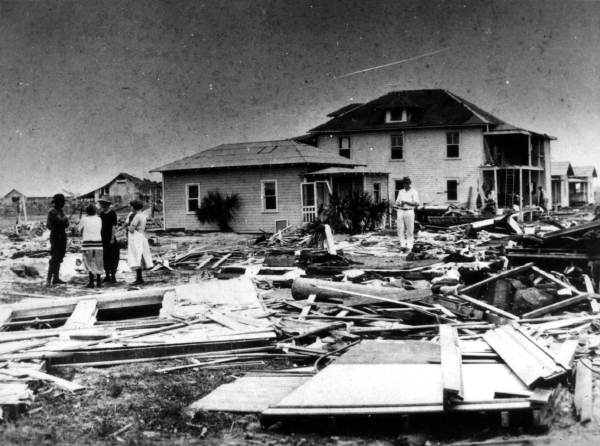
Wreckage in Hialeah after the storm

Along its path the tornado killed five people and injured 35 others. It tore apart 75 homes, including about 25 in or near Elizabeth Park, leaving more than 500 people homeless. Property losses totaled $250,000, with cleanup costs of about $1 million. The Miami Order of Elks loaned $10,000 in relief aid, and 100 workers cleared debris at the White Belt Dairy. The aftermath drew as many as 30,000 sightseers a day. Many cars were stranded by motorists and wrecked during the storm. Based on damage photographs, the tornado is estimated to have been an F3 on the Fujita scale, the only other such tornado to hit Miami having occurred in 1959. To date it is the only deadly tornado to strike Dade County, belonging to a small group of tornadoes that have killed three or more people in Florida.

== See also ==
- List of North American tornadoes and tornado outbreaks
- 1997 Miami tornado – A much weaker tornado which was also quite visible that hit the same area
