= 1959 Escuminac disaster =

Category 1 Atlantic hurricane

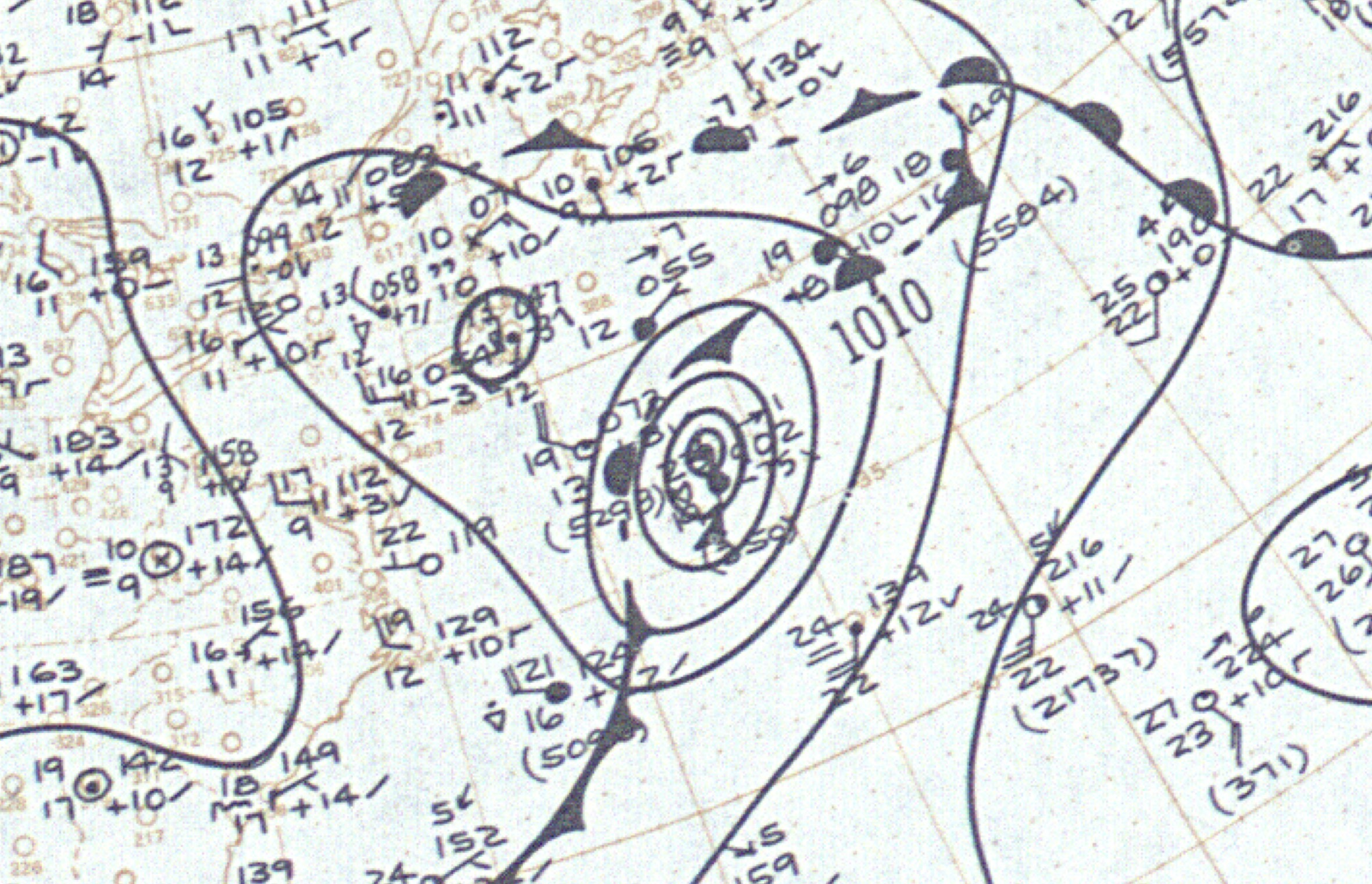
- Surface weather analysis of the hurricane nearing extratropical transition on June 19

Meteorological history
- Formed: June 18, 1959
- Extratropical: June 19, 1959
- Dissipated: June 21, 1959

Category 1 hurricane
- 1-minute sustained (SSHWS/NWS)
- Highest winds: 85 mph (140 km/h)
- Lowest pressure: 974 mbar (hPa); 28.76 inHg

Overall effects
- Fatalities: 35 direct
- Damage: $2.5 million (1959 USD)
- Areas affected: Florida, Atlantic Canada
- IBTrACS
- Part of the 1959 Atlantic hurricane season

The 1959 Escuminac disaster, also known as the Escuminac hurricane, was considered the worst fishing-related disaster in the Canadian province of New Brunswick in 100 years. It occurred due to the extratropical remnants of an Atlantic hurricane. The storm was the third tropical cyclone and first hurricane of the 1959 Atlantic hurricane season, and developed from a tropical wave in the central Gulf of Mexico on June 18. It headed rapidly northeastward and struck Florida later that day. Shortly after entering the Atlantic Ocean, it strengthened into a tropical storm later on June 18. By the following day, it had strengthened into a hurricane. However, it transitioned into an extratropical cyclone about six hours later. The remnants struck Atlantic Canada, once in Nova Scotia and again in Newfoundland before dissipating on June 21.

In its early stages, the storm dropped moderately heavy rainfall in Florida, which caused damage to crops. A tornado near Miami and high tides on the west coast of the state also resulted in damage. Overall, losses in Florida were around $1.7 million (1959 USD). After becoming extratropical, the storm caused significant effects in Atlantic Canada. About 45 boats were in the Northumberland Strait between New Brunswick and Prince Edward Island, and they did not have radio to receive warning of the approaching storm. Rough seas of up to 49 ft (15 m) in height damaged or destroyed many boats. At least 22 fishing boats capsized with their crews, causing 35 fatalities. High winds also disrupted communications in some areas, and several houses sustained damage, costing $750,000 (1959 CAD, $781,000 1959 USD). The event became the deadliest work-related disaster in New Brunswick.

== Early history ==
Map plotting the storm's track and intensity, according to the Saffir–Simpson scale Map key Saffir–Simpson scale Tropical depression (≤38 mph, ≤62 km/h) Tropical storm (39–73 mph, 63–118 km/h) Category 1 (74–95 mph, 119–153 km/h) Category 2 (96–110 mph, 154–177 km/h) Category 3 (111–129 mph, 178–208 km/h) Category 4 (130–156 mph, 209–251 km/h) Category 5 (≥157 mph, ≥252 km/h) Unknown Storm type Tropical cyclone Subtropical cyclone Extratropical cyclone, remnant low, tropical disturbance, or monsoon depression

On June 15, a tropical wave with associated instability was observed in the northwestern Caribbean Sea. It moved into the central Gulf of Mexico on June 16, and the next day developed a weak circulation at the same time that Tropical Storm Beulah was on the other side of the gulf. The system in the eastern gulf moved to the northeast, becoming a tropical depression by June 18 at 00:00 UTC. Moving quickly to the northeast, the system moved across central Florida in less than six hours, making landfall near Tampa Bay and exiting near Cape Canaveral.

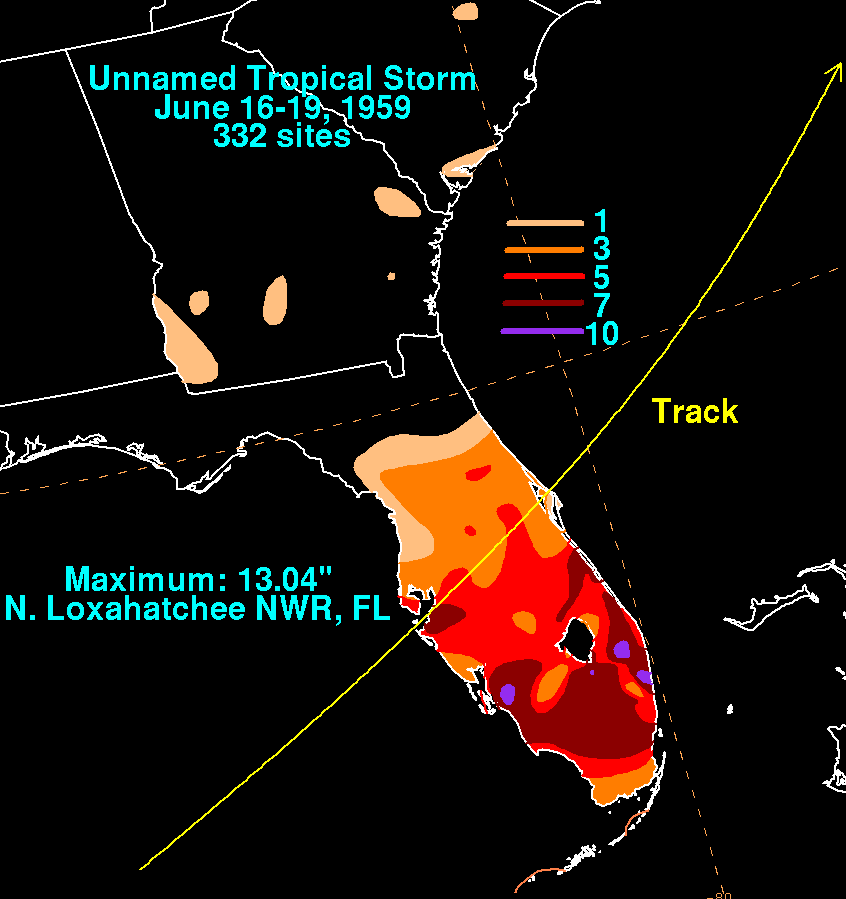
Rainfall totals from the storm in Florida

As the depression struck western Florida, it produced 3 ft (1 m) above-normal tides, which damaged docks and caused beach erosion. Wind gusts near Sarasota reached about 49 mph (79 km/h). After previously wet conditions, the system dropped heavy rainfall across the state, unofficially reaching 15 in (380 mm) in some areas and causing flooding. Along the Indian River, flooding damaged citrus crops, and statewide some roads were damaged. When the storm was first forming in the Gulf of Mexico, it spawned an F3 tornado in Miami that lasted for over 20 minutes. The National Climatic Data Center considered it the worst tornado in the city since 1925, and the overall path was about 12 mi (19 km). A total of 77 people were injured due to the tornado, mostly due to cuts from broken glass, and damage from it was estimated at $1.5 million. Another tornado was reported north of West Palm Beach, although it affected a sparsely populated area; total damage statewide totaled $1,656,000.

== Storm approach to Canada ==
Late on June 18, it is estimated the depression intensified into a tropical storm, and that day the Miami Hurricane Center issued its last advisory, warning ships of the potential for future strengthening. The storm moved rapidly to the northeast, passing halfway between Bermuda and North Carolina early on June 19. At 02:50 UTC that day, a ship reported a falling barometric pressure of 993 hPa (29.3 inHg; 993 mbar) with west-southwesterly winds of 92 mph (148 km/h). Although it was associated with a diffused frontal zone, the storm maintained a warm core and initially remained largely tropical. At 12:00 UTC on June 19, it is estimated the storm intensified into a hurricane about halfway between Bermuda and Nova Scotia, with a pressure of 974 hPa (28.8 inHg; 974 mbar). Six hours later, it became extratropical, although the former hurricane intensified further to peak winds of 80 mph (130 km/h). On June 20, the storm slowed and turned sharply to the northwest. It weakened slightly before moving ashore near Canso, Nova Scotia. Crossing the island, it struck Prince Edward Island before turning sharply to the east and crossing Nova Scotia again. Late on June 20, it re-emerged into the Atlantic Ocean and continued to the east-northeast. The extratropical storm moved over southeastern Newfoundland and dissipated on June 21.

Before the storm reached Atlantic Canada, the meteorological branch of the Department of Transport provided notices for the advancing storm. On the day of the storm, the forecast from the Halifax weather office was for light winds, and although it was amended to highlight severe conditions, boats in the region had no radio to learn of the threat. There were many salmon in the region, which prompted fishermen to set sail. As the storm approached, there were about 45 boats in the Northumberland Strait between New Brunswick and Prince Edward Island.

== Impact and aftermath ==
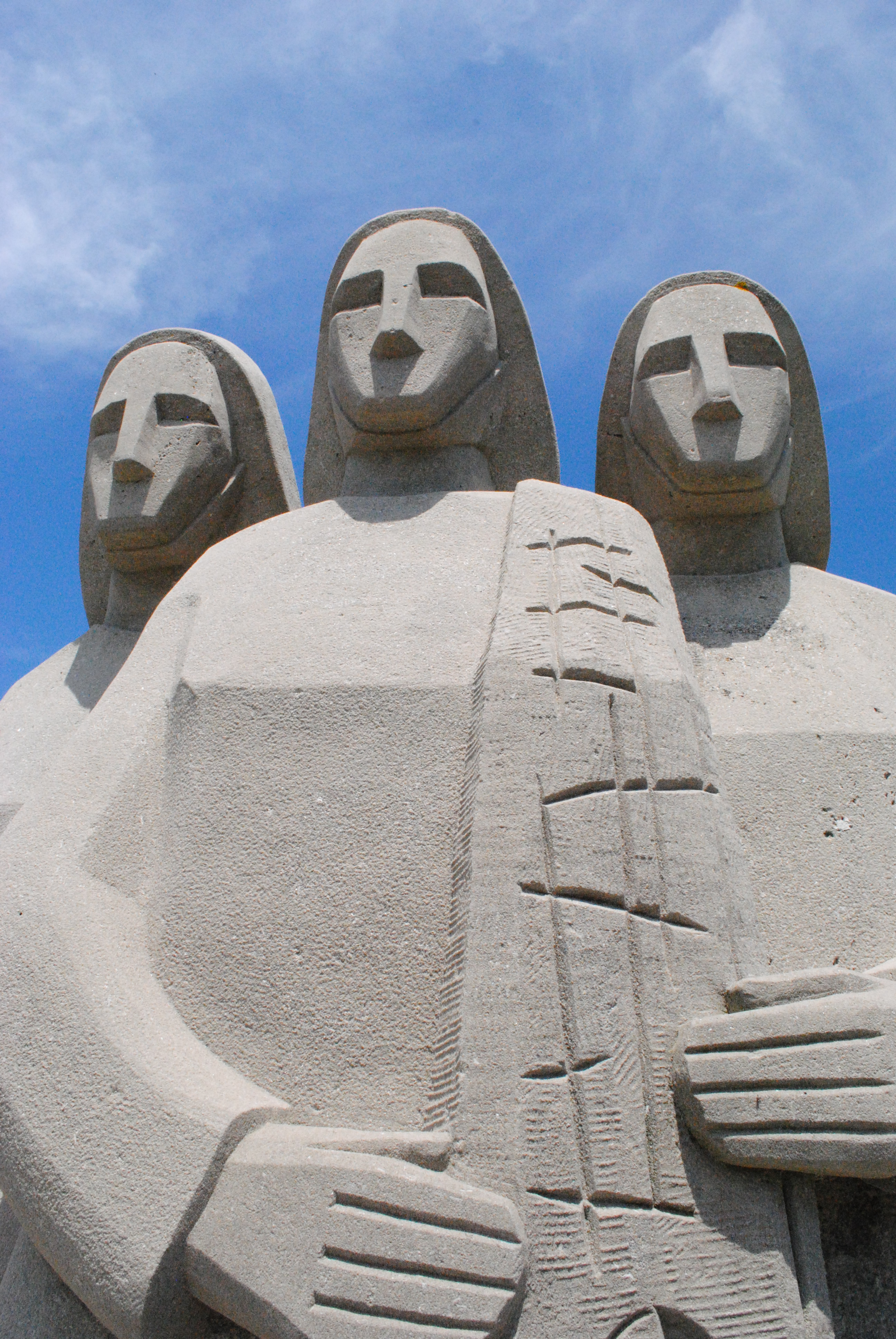
Escuminac Disaster Memorial at Escuminac, New Brunswick for the victims of the storm

Along the coast of New Brunswick, the storm produced 49 ft (15 m) waves that destroyed several boats, including 22 over open waters between Point Escuminac and Richibucto. Two bodies washed ashore in the latter, and eleven bodies were eventually discovered. About one-third of the salmon boats in Miramichi were destroyed. Across New Brunswick, the storm disrupted communications near the coast. Along the coasts of New Brunswick and Prince Edward Island, high waves destroyed cottages and forced some families to evacuate. The former hurricane produced strong winds in the region, peaking at 75 mph (121 km/h), and its passage was accompanied by moderate rainfall, peaking at 4.29 in (109 mm) in Nova Scotia. There, many lobster cages were destroyed, and boats were removed from their moorings. In Prince Edward Island, up to 50% of the lobster traps were destroyed or missing, including 5,000 destroyed traps near Souris. As with New Brunswick, several boats were destroyed or washed ashore, and damage in the province was estimated at $750,000 (1959 CAD, $781,000 1959 USD). A total of 35 people were killed between Nova Scotia and Prince Edward Island, mostly fishermen. As a result, the Escuminac disaster, as it came to be known, became the deadliest work-related disaster in New Brunswick. The minister of fisheries considered the event to be "the worst disaster to hit a Canadian fishing fleet in about 100 years".

In the days after the storm, the Royal Canadian Air Force and Royal Canadian Mounted Police operated search and rescue missions, while families waited on the beach. The Canadian Red Cross set up headquarters in Escuminac to assist the victims. Due to storm fatalities, 24 adults became widows, and 83 children lost their fathers. As a result, the New Brunswick Fishermen's Disaster Fund was created to assist the families. The fund raised $400,000 in a few months from donations from throughout Canada, as well as Pope John XXIII and Queen Elizabeth II, the latter of whom was on a tour of the country at the time.

In memory of the storm victims, artist Claude Roussel created a wood sculpture entitled Les Pêcheurs – The Fishermen, which won first prize at New Brunswick Museum in 1962. Later, residents near Escuminac raised money to turn the work into a stone monument, which was dedicated on June 19, 1969. It was nearly 7 ft (2.1 m) in height, weighed about 10,000 lb (5 tonnes), and depicted a group of fishermen working together, with the names of the deceased on a bronze plaque. In 2001, the government of New Brunswick declared the Escuminac Disaster Monument as a provincial historical site.

== See also ==
- List of Canada hurricanes
- List of Florida hurricanes (1950–1974)
