= Tropical Storm Arlene (1959) =

Atlantic tropical storm in 1959

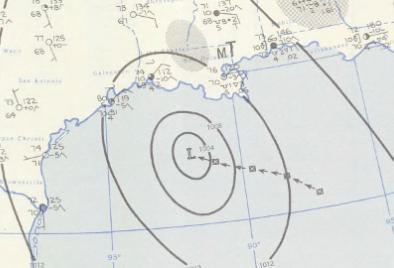
- Weather map depicting Tropical Storm Arlene off the coast of Louisiana on May 30

Meteorological history
- Formed: May 28, 1959
- Dissipated: May 31, 1959

Tropical storm
- 1-minute sustained (SSHWS/NWS)
- Highest winds: 65 mph (100 km/h)
- Lowest pressure: 993 mbar (hPa); 29.32 inHg

Overall effects
- Fatalities: 1 indirect
- Damage: $500,000 (1959 USD)
- Areas affected: Louisiana, Texas, Mississippi, Alabama, Georgia, and South Carolina
- IBTrACS
- Part of the 1959 Atlantic hurricane season

Tropical Storm Arlene was a short lived, pre-season tropical storm which made landfall on the central Louisiana coastline on May 30, 1959, causing minor damages and one fatality. Arlene, the first named storm of the 1959 Atlantic hurricane season, developed out of a tropical wave which was first noted near the Dominican Republic on May 23. Development of the system was slow before it gained enough convection to be declared Tropical Storm Arlene on May 28. The storm slowly intensified and reached its peak intensity of 60 mph (97 km/h) on May 30. Rapid weakening took place as the storm neared land and Arlene made landfall with winds of 45 mph (72 km/h) later that night. Arlene weakened to what is now classified as a Tropical Depression early the next morning. The system degenerated into a remnant low on the afternoon of May 31 and fully dissipated late on June 2 while located over South Carolina.

Arlene dropped heavy rains totaling over 1 ft (0.30 m) in localized areas as it moved into the Southeast United States. The maximum rainfall amount was 13.55 in (344 mm), recorded in Merrill, Mississippi, over a three-day period. The heavy rains caused minor flooding in Louisiana and property damage from the storm amounted to $500,000 ($3.7 million 2008 USD). One death was indirectly attributed to the storm when a man drowned in rough surf off the Texas coast.

== Meteorological history ==
Map plotting the storm's track and intensity, according to the Saffir–Simpson scale Map key Saffir–Simpson scale Tropical depression (≤38 mph, ≤62 km/h) Tropical storm (39–73 mph, 63–118 km/h) Category 1 (74–95 mph, 119–153 km/h) Category 2 (96–110 mph, 154–177 km/h) Category 3 (111–129 mph, 178–208 km/h) Category 4 (130–156 mph, 209–251 km/h) Category 5 (≥157 mph, ≥252 km/h) Unknown Storm type Tropical cyclone Subtropical cyclone Extratropical cyclone, remnant low, tropical disturbance, or monsoon depression

Tropical Storm Arlene developed out of a tropical wave which was first noted near the Dominican Republic on May 23. The wave slowly developed as it moved westward through the Caribbean Sea and developed into an area of low pressure on May 25. By May 27, the low entered the Gulf of Mexico and a ship report the next day showed that the low had developed a closed low-level circulation. Early the next morning, the low was determined to have intensified into Tropical Storm Arlene, the first storm of the season, while located 300 mi (480 km) south-southeast of New Orleans, Louisiana with winds estimated at 40 mph (64 km/h). Arlene was moving towards the northwest at 10 to 15 mph (16 to 24 km/h). Arlene slowly intensified throughout the day as it continued towards the northwest at 12 to 15 mph (19 to 24 km/h). On May 29, Arlene turned towards the west and its foreword motion slowed before becoming nearly stationary that night.

The storm was located 150 mi (240 km) south of Lafayette, Louisiana as it drifted northward and winds were estimated to have peaked at 50 mph (80 km/h). However, in the post-season, it was determined that Arlene peaked near landfall with winds of 65 mph (105 km/h). As Arlene neared the coast, the storm began to weaken due to the interaction with land. Arlene made landfall about 40 mi (64 km) southeast of Lafayette, Louisiana at 2100 UTC (4 p.m. CST). The operational landfall intensity was 50 mph (80 km/h) but it was lowered to 45 mph (72 km/h) in the post season. Upon making landfall, Arlene became the earliest landfalling tropical cyclone in Louisiana history. Arlene weakened quickly to a tropical depression shortly after landfall. The storm further degenerated to a remnant area of low-pressure on the afternoon of May 31. The remnant of the storm lingered in the Southern United States until June 2, when it dissipated over South Carolina. Although the original low pressure system dissipated, a new, non tropical center formed further north over Virginia. This new low quickly tracked northeast, brushing the southern coast of New England before moving over Nova Scotia and losing its identity on June 3.

== Preparations and impact ==
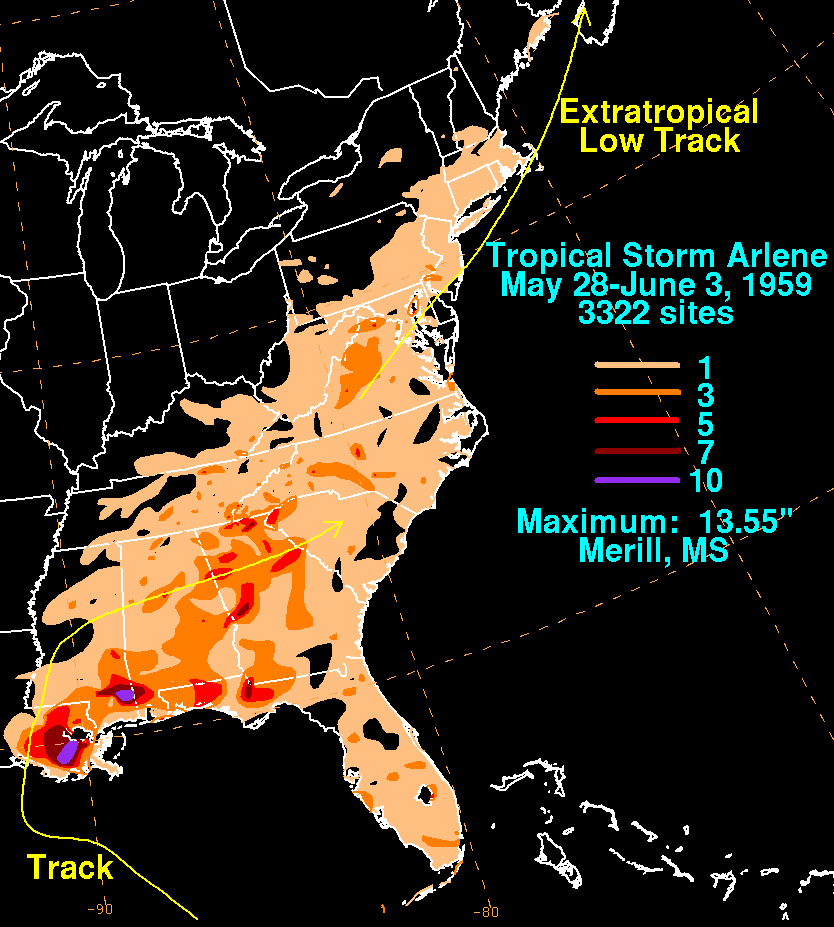
Storm total rainfall from Arlene

The low that eventually became Arlene prompted wind warnings and small craft advisories for both coasts in southern Florida on May 27. The small craft advisory was significantly expanded the next day when the low was upgraded to Tropical Storm Arlene. The new warnings stretched from Sabine Pass, Texas to Saint Marks, Florida. Gale warnings were also issued upon the upgrade from Morgan City, Louisiana to Pascagoula, Mississippi. Rough seas and tides of two to four feet (0.6 to 1.2 metres)—also known as storm surge—were expected in the areas under the gale warning. By May 29, all craft were advised not to leave port in Louisiana. Memories of Hurricane Audrey led to numerous residents evacuating coastal areas upon hearing about Arlene. In Pierre, 50 families evacuated to higher grounds. Officials reported that 25 families were also evacuated from low-lying areas in Vermilion Parish. As Arlene neared landfall, the small craft advisory was canceled from Pensacola, Florida southward. The new warnings extended from Pensacola to Galveston, Texas. The gale warnings shifted more towards the west, now extending from Galveston, Texas to Grand Isle, Louisiana.

Arlene produced winds up to 55 mph (89 km/h) with gusts up to 75 mph (121 km/h) upon landfall. The lowest pressure recorded on land was 999.7 mbar (hPa; 29.52 inHg), which was rounded up to 1000 mbar (hPa; 29.53 inHg) for the minimum pressure of the storm. Minor storm surge up to three feet was recorded at Weeks Island and Point Au Fer, Louisiana. Heavy rains fell across much of the southeastern Louisiana coastline. During a 24‑hour span, 10.92 in (277 mm) of rain fell in Moisant International Airport. Roughly 2 ft (0.61 m) of water flooded the control tower at the airport, forcing traffic control workers to relocate to the new tower which was under-construction. A state maximum rainfall of 13.13 in (334 mm) fell in Houma. Along the coast, a few towns reported downed trees and electrical lines from high winds, resulting in scattered power outages.

At the height of the storm, several of the main roads in New Orleans were shut down due to flooding. At least 100 homes were flooded by the storm. In Baton Rouge, dozens of people were evacuated from a flooded home via ambulance and wagon to safer areas. In nearby Mississippi, rainfall from the storm was mainly confined to the southeastern counties; however, significant accumulations, peaking at 13.55 in (344 mm), were recorded. Rain from the remnant low spread into Georgia. Some stream flooding and crop damage were reported but overall, the damage was minor. In all, Arlene caused $500,000 ($3.7 million 2010 USD) in damage. One death was related to Arlene; a man drowned in rough surf off the Galveston coast. After the initial low dissipated over the southeastern United States, the extratropical remnants of Arlene brought moderate rainfall to parts of the Mid-Atlantic States and New England.

== See also ==
- Other storms of the same name
- List of off-season Atlantic hurricanes
