= Hurricane Gracie =

Category 4 Atlantic hurricane in 1959

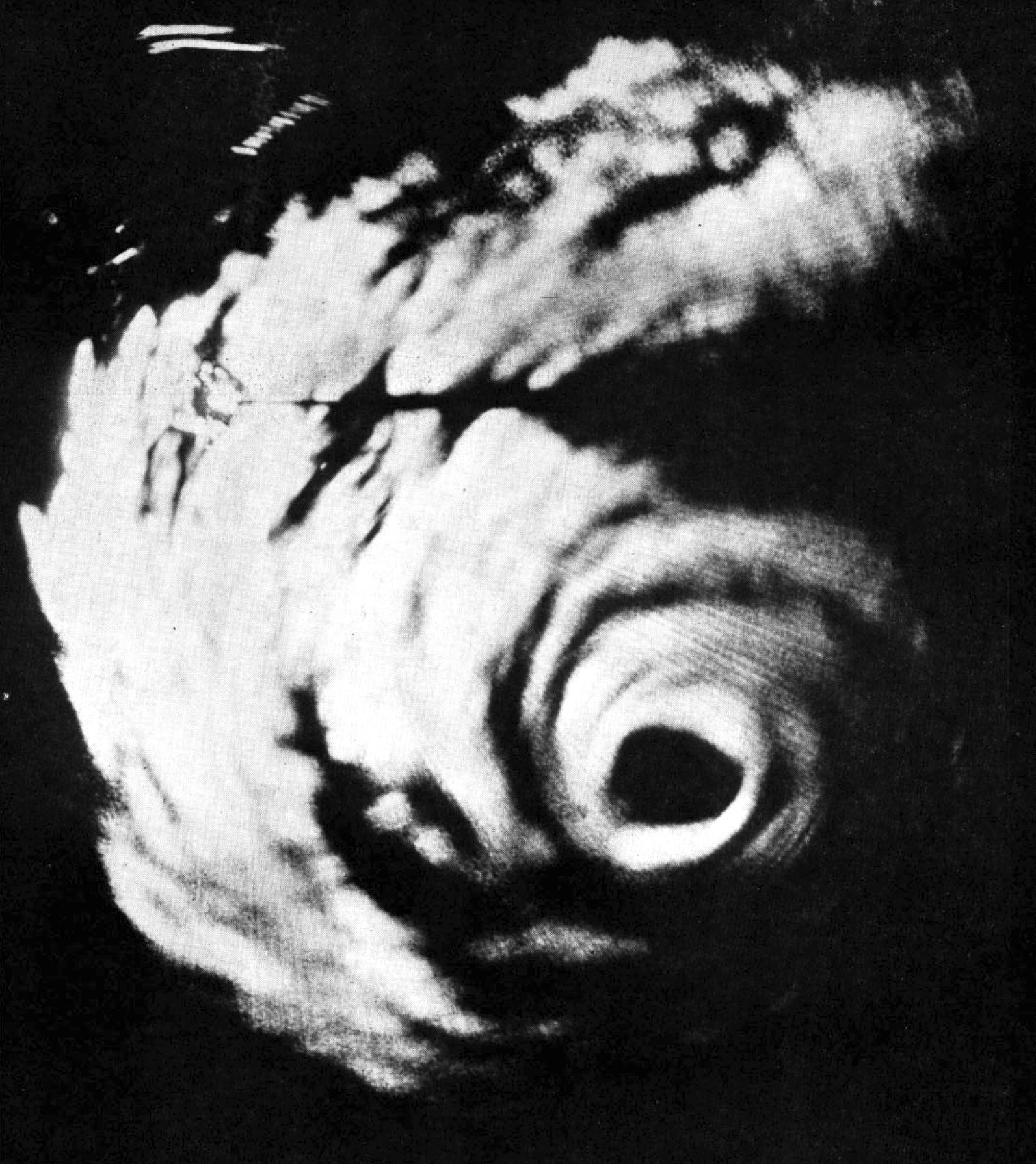
- Radar image of Hurricane Gracie taken by the United States Navy

Meteorological history
- Formed: September 20, 1959
- Extratropical: September 30, 1959
- Dissipated: October 2, 1959

Category 4 major hurricane
- 1-minute sustained (SSHWS/NWS)
- Highest winds: 140 mph (220 km/h)
- Lowest pressure: 950 mbar (hPa); 28.05 inHg

Overall effects
- Fatalities: 22 direct
- Damage: $14 million (1959 USD)
- Areas affected: Bahamas, Georgia, The Carolinas, Virginia, Northeastern United States, Atlantic Canada
- IBTrACS
- Part of the 1959 Atlantic hurricane season

Hurricane Gracie was a powerful hurricane that formed in September 1959, the strongest during the 1959 Atlantic hurricane season and the most intense to strike the United States since Hurricane Hazel in 1954. The system was first noted as an area of thunderstorms east of the Lesser Antilles which moved just north of the Greater Antilles, quickly intensifying into a hurricane on September 22. Gracie was a storm that was very difficult to forecast, with its movement unpredictable. After five days of erratic motion, Gracie became a major hurricane which struck South Carolina, and weakened as it moved up the Appalachians, bringing much needed rain to a drought-plagued region. Much of the destruction related with Gracie was centered on Beaufort, South Carolina. Gracie became an extratropical cyclone on September 30 while moving through the Eastern United States.

== Meteorological history ==
Map plotting the storm's track and intensity, according to the Saffir–Simpson scale Map key Saffir–Simpson scale Tropical depression (≤38 mph, ≤62 km/h) Tropical storm (39–73 mph, 63–118 km/h) Category 1 (74–95 mph, 119–153 km/h) Category 2 (96–110 mph, 154–177 km/h) Category 3 (111–129 mph, 178–208 km/h) Category 4 (130–156 mph, 209–251 km/h) Category 5 (≥157 mph, ≥252 km/h) Unknown Storm type Tropical cyclone Subtropical cyclone Extratropical cyclone, remnant low, tropical disturbance, or monsoon depression

An area of squally weather was first noted a few hundred miles east of the Lesser Antilles on September 18. The convective area organized into a tropical depression near the north coast of Hispaniola on September 20. After moving west-northwestward for a day, it turned northeastward, where upper-level winds were very favorable and steering currents were very weak. On September 22 Gracie was named as a tropical depression before it developed into Tropical Storm Gracie, followed by reaching hurricane strength later that night. It turned to the east on September 25, and turned back west to west-northwest on September 27 as a stable anticyclone built in to its north.

Gracie quickly strengthened and reached its peak of 140 mph (230 km/h) winds on September 29, but cooler air and land interaction weakened it slightly to a 130 mph (215 km/h) Category 4 major hurricane at the time of its landfall at 1625 UTC over St. Helena Sound near the south end of Edisto Island in South Carolina. After landfall, Gracie moved inland and north and became extratropical on September 30. Gracie's remnants persisted for several days as they slowly turned northeastward and then eastward. Gracie's remnants emerged into the Atlantic on October 2, before dissipating later that day.

== Preparations ==
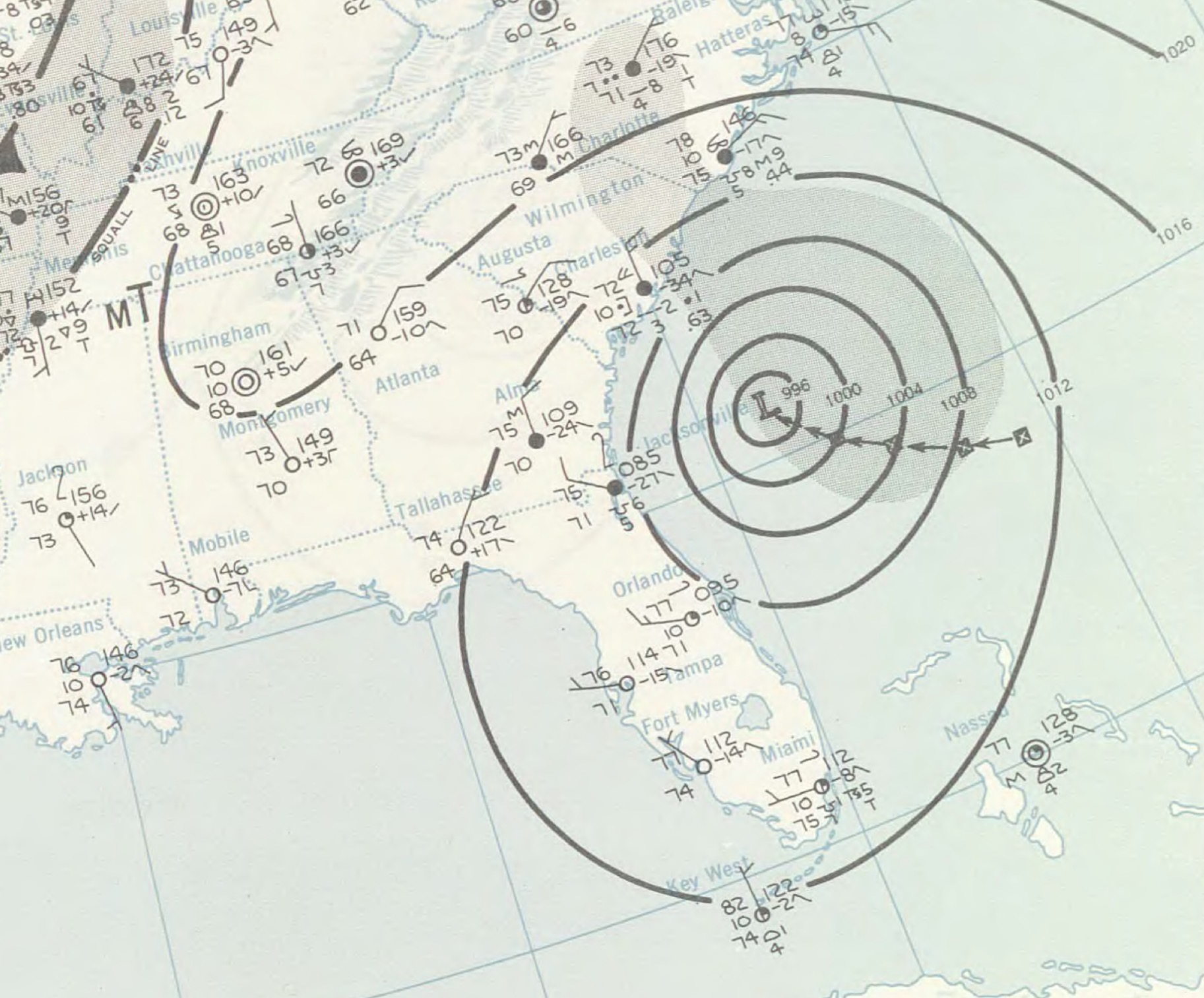
Surface weather analysis shows Hurricane Gracie approaching landfall in South Carolina on September 29

A hurricane watch was issued for the coast of the United States from Savannah, Georgia to Wilmington, North Carolina at 1600 UTC on September 28, which were quickly updated to hurricane warnings by 1900 UTC the same day. By 1900 UTC, gale warnings were in effect from Daytona Beach, Florida to Savannah, Georgia as well as from Wilmington to Morehead City, North Carolina. At 1200 UTC on September 29, gale warnings were dropped south of Brunswick, Georgia. At 2200 UTC, gale warnings were extended northward to Cape May, New Jersey, including Chesapeake Bay and Delaware Bay. At 0400 UTC on September 30, all warnings south of Cape Hatteras were dropped, leaving gale warnings in effect from Cape Hatteras northward. At 1000 UTC, small craft were advised to remain in port from Cape May northward to Block Island, Rhode Island. By 1600 UTC, due to Gracie's continued weakening, all remaining gale warnings were downgraded to small craft warnings.

== Impact ==
=== Georgia and South Carolina ===
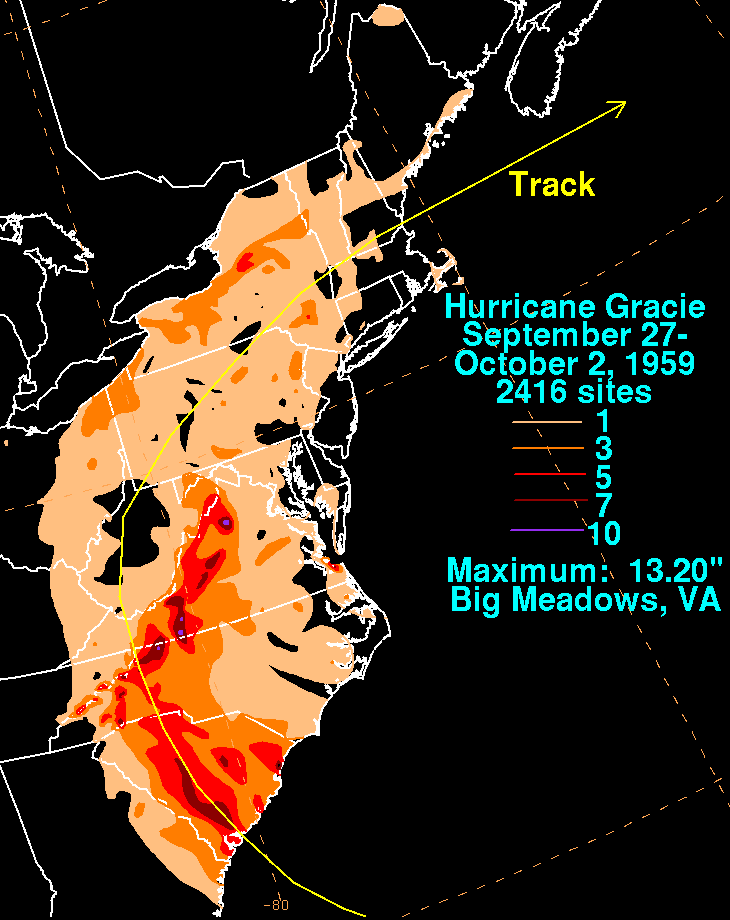
Gracie's Rainfall across the United States

Storm surge flooding was minimal due to the storm's landfall near the time of low tide. However, Charleston still recorded their highest tide since 1940. Along the coast of southern South Carolina, the storm tide was measured up to 11.9 feet (3.6 m) above mean lower low water (the average level of the lowest low tide each day). The United States Coast Guard vessel Bramble evacuated people stranded in Savannah and Charleston on September 30. Gracie killed 10 people in South Carolina and Georgia, mainly due to wind and rain-induced automobile accidents, falling trees and electrocution by live wires. The Garden Club of South Carolina replaced numerous trees after the storm. Wind damage was quite significant across South Carolina, particularly the city of Beaufort, South Carolina, with many downed trees, telephone poles, and streetlights. Also, numerous windows were shattered and shingles were torn off of roofs. A number of creeks overflowed causing floodwaters that, in areas, were several feet deep. The opening of the Beaufort Center of the University of South Carolina was delayed due to Gracie. It would be 30 years before another major hurricane struck South Carolina: Hurricane Hugo in September 1989.

=== Elsewhere in the United States ===
Heavy rains fell well ahead of the storm along an inverted trough extending north of the storm, causing 6.79 inches (172 mm) between the mornings of September 28 and September 29 at Norfolk, Virginia. The highest rainfall amount measured during the storm was 13.20 inches (335 mm) at Big Meadows. The storm spawned six tornadoes in all. This included three F3 tornadoes which accompanied the dissipating storm through Virginia, killing 12 people and injuring 13 near Charlottesville, Virginia. Three F1 tornadoes had touched down in the Carolinas prior to those touching down. For the most part, rainfall from Gracie was beneficial as it moved up the Appalachians since the area had been in a drought preceding the cyclone.

== Long-term impact ==
Edisto Beach, South Carolina was changed forever by Gracie, due to human efforts to renourish the beach after its passage. Most of the shell hash beach currently at Edisto was placed there after Gracie. In order to expand the beach, an inland marsh was excavated and moved to the shoreline. This created highly desirable beach front property which led to new development along the coast seaward of Palmetto Boulevard, but also created an environmental catastrophe along the nearby ocean floor. A species of isopod which grows in coastal estuaries, the Cyathura Polita, disappeared after the passage of this hurricane from the Ashepoo River in South Carolina. The Kermadec petrel, a bird, was swept to Lookout Mountain Sanctuary in Pennsylvania during Gracie, marking the first time it appeared in North America.

== See also ==
- List of Category 4 Atlantic hurricanes
- List of South Carolina hurricanes
- List of United States hurricanes
