= List of South Carolina hurricanes =

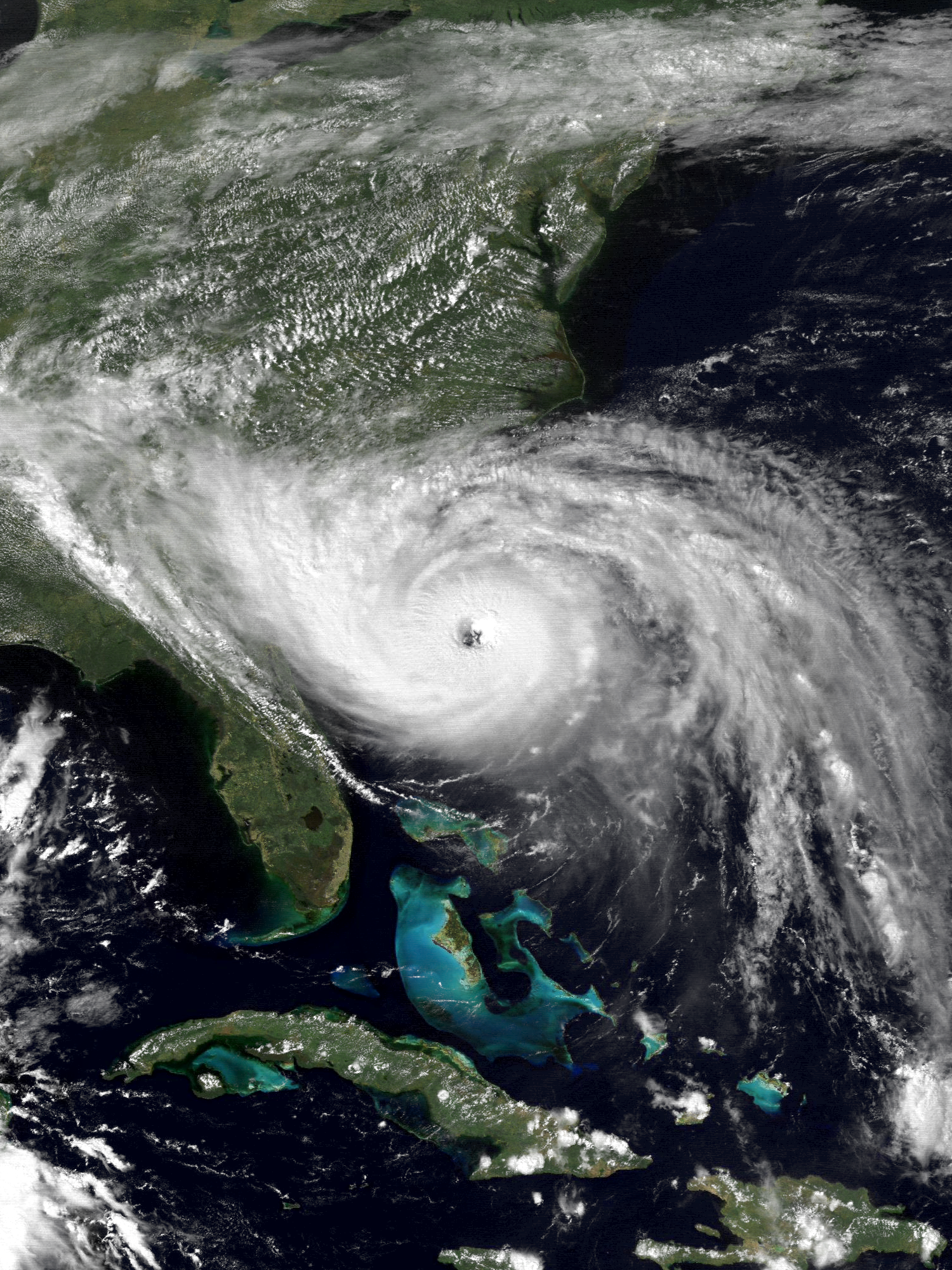
Hurricane Hugo approaching South Carolina as a Category 4 hurricane on September 21, 1989

Since 1851, 132 tropical or subtropical cyclones have either directly or indirectly affected the state of South Carolina, with the most recent being Chantal in 2025.

== List of storms ==
=== Pre–1900 ===
- August 24–25, 1851 – A tropical storm moved through the state.
- August 28, 1852 – A tropical storm moved through the state.
- October 10, 1852 – A tropical storm moved through the state.
- September 9, 1854 – A tropical storm moved through the state.
- September 1, 1856 – A tropical storm moved through the state.
- September 17, 1859 – A tropical storm moved through northwestern portions of the state.
- June 22, 1867 – A Category 1 hurricane made landfall to the east of Charleston.
- August 28, 1871 – A tropical depression moved through southern portions of the state.
- October 6, 1871 – A tropical storm moved southern portions of the state.
- September 20, 1873 – A fast-moving tropical storm moved through southern portions of the state.
- September 28, 1874 – A Category 1 hurricane made landfall near Seabrook Island.
- October 4, 1877 – A tropical storm moved through the state.
- September 12, 1878 – A Category 1 hurricane made landfall near Edisto Beach.
- September 11, 1882 – A tropical storm moved through northwestern portions of the state.
- September 11–12, 1884 – A slow-moving tropical depression struck the state.
- August 25, 1885 – A Category 2 hurricane made landfall on Kiawah Island. 21 deaths were reported.
- October 12, 1885 – A tropical storm moved through the state.
- June 22, 1886 – A tropical storm moved through the state.
- July 1, 1886 – A tropical storm moved through the state.
- October 20, 1887 – A tropical depression moved through the state.
- September 10, 1888 – A tropical storm moved through the state.
- September 24, 1889 – A tropical storm moved through the state.
- June 16, 1893 – A tropical storm moved through the state.
- August 27, 1893 – The devastating Sea Islands Hurricane struck the Sea Islands region of Georgia and South Carolina, causing major damage. An estimated 1,000–2,000 people were killed between both states.
- October 4, 1893 – A tropical storm moved through the state.
- October 13, 1893 – A Category 3 hurricane made landfall near McClellanville, causing major damage. 15 deaths were reported.
- September 27, 1894 – A Category 1 hurricane made landfall near Port Royal.
- October 10, 1894 – After impacting Georgia, a hurricane entered southwestern South Carolina briefly as a Category 1, later impacting other portions of the state as a tropical storm.
- July 8, 1896 – A tropical depression moved through northwestern parts of the state.
- September 29, 1896 – The Cedar Key hurricane moved through South Carolina as a Category 2 hurricane, producing significant damage. Seven deaths were reported.
- August 31, 1898 – A Category 1 hurricane made landfall near Hilton Head Island.
- October 31, 1899 – A Category 2 hurricane made landfall near Myrtle Beach.

=== 1900–1949 ===
- July 13, 1901 – A tropical storm briefly entered northeastern South Carolina, dissipating shortly thereafter.
- September 18, 1901 – A tropical storm moved through the state.
- June 16, 1902 – A tropical storm moved through the state.
- September 16, 1903 – A tropical depression briefly entered northwestern South Carolina, dissipating shortly thereafter.
- September 14, 1904 – A Category 1 hurricane made landfall near Cedar Island. Three deaths were reported after a ship capsized in the storm.
- November 4, 1904 – A tropical depression moved through the state.
- September 17, 1906 – A Category 1 hurricane made landfall near Myrtle Beach.
- September 29, 1907 – A tropical storm moved through southern portions of the state.
- July 3, 1909 – A tropical depression moved through southern portions of the state.
- October 19–20, 1910 – The 1910 Cuba hurricane closely paralleled the coastline of South Carolina as a tropical storm before moving out to sea.
- August 28, 1911 – A Category 2 hurricane made landfall near Hilton Head Island. In total, 17 deaths were reported.
- September 4, 1913 – A tropical depression moved through northern portions of the state.
- October 8–10, 1913 – A Category 1 hurricane made landfall near McClellanville on October 8.
- August 3, 1915 – A tropical storm moved through the state.
- May 16, 1916 – A tropical storm moved through the state.
- July 14–15, 1916 – A Category 2 hurricane made landfall east of Charleston on July 14. One death was reported in Lynchburg from a falling tree.
- September 17, 1924 – A tropical storm moved through southeastern portions of the state.
- October 3, 1927 – A tropical storm made landfall near Beaufort.
- September 18, 1928 – A category 1 hurricane made landfall near Edisto Island.
- October 11, 1928 – The extratropical remnants of a hurricane moved through the state.
- October 2, 1929 – The extratropical remnants of a hurricane moved through the state.
- September 5–6, 1935 – A tropical storm moved through the state.
- August 11, 1940 – The 1940 South Carolina hurricane made landfall near Hilton Head Island as a Category 2 hurricane. A storm tide of 13 feet (4.0 m) was measured along the coast, while up to 10.84 inches (275 mm) of rain fell in Beaufort. In total, 35 deaths were reported.
- October 8, 1941 – A tropical storm moved through the state.
- October 20, 1944 – A tropical storm moved through the state.
- September 17–18, 1945 – A tropical storm moved through the state.
- October 9, 1946 – A tropical storm moved through the state.
- September 24, 1947 – The extratropical remnants of a tropical storm moved through the state.
- August 28, 1949 – A tropical storm moved through northwestern portions of the state.

=== 1950–1999 ===
- October 22, 1950 – Hurricane Love briefly entered the state as a tropical depression, dissipating shortly thereafter.
- August 31, 1952 – Hurricane Able made landfall near Beaufort as a Category 2 hurricane. Two indirect deaths were reported.
- September 28, 1952 – A tropical storm made landfall near Myrtle Beach.
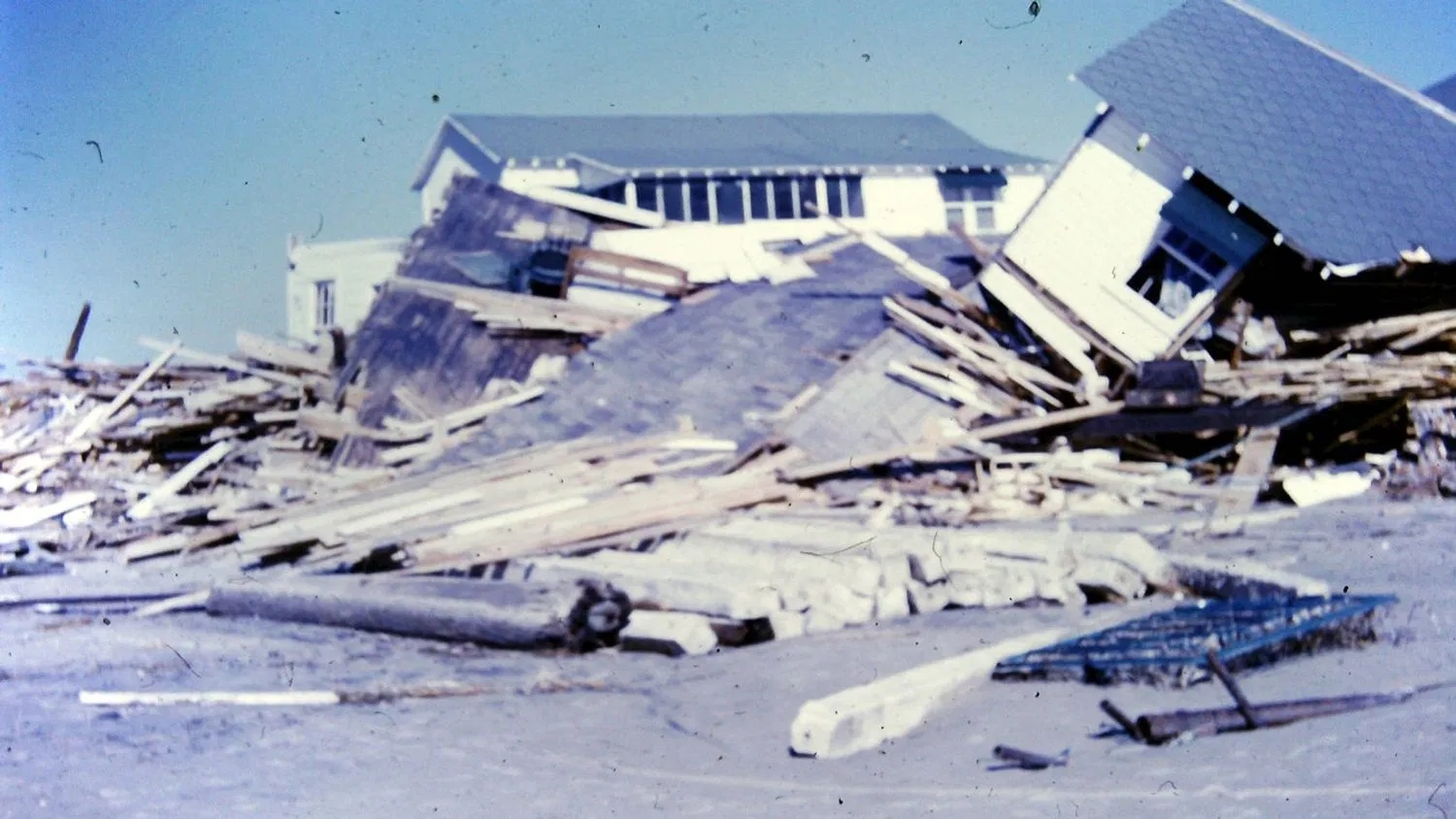
  Destroyed houses in Pawleys Island after Hurricane Hazel
- October 15, 1954 – Hurricane Hazel made landfall near the North Carolina and South Carolina border as a Category 4 hurricane with sustained winds of 130 mph (215 km/h), causing major damage. Tides of 10–11 ft (3.0–3.4 m) were reported along the coastline, destroying hundreds of buildings. One death was reported.
- September 26, 1956 – The extratropical remnants of Hurricane Flossy moved through the state.
- June 2, 1959 – Tropical Storm Arlene briefly entered the state as a tropical depression, dissipating shortly thereafter.
- July 9–10, 1959 – Hurricane Cindy made landfall near McClellanville as a Category 1 hurricane on July 9, producing relatively minor damage. However, up to 9.79 inches (249 mm) of rain fell in Winnsboro, and one death was reported.

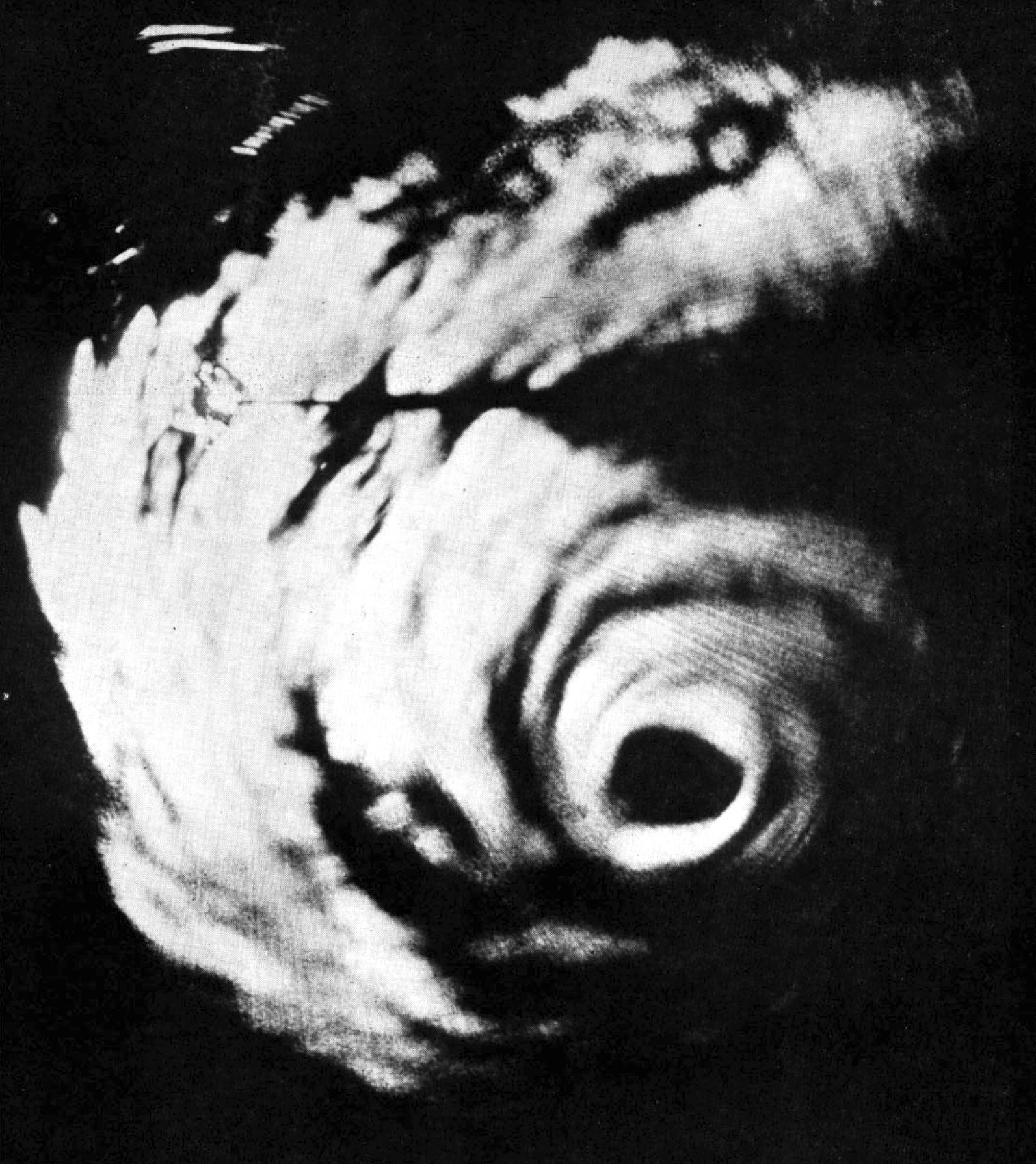
Radar image of Hurricane Gracie taken by the United States Navy

- September 29–30, 1959 – Hurricane Gracie made landfall near Edisto Island as a Category 4 hurricane with sustained winds of 130 mph (215 km/h) on September 29, causing major damage. Water levels of 8.14 feet (2.48 m) were observed in Charleston Harbor, while wind gusts estimated near 150 mph (240 km/h) occurred in coastal Beaufort, Colleton and Charleston counties. In total, 10 deaths were reported.
- July 29, 1960 – Tropical Storm Brenda closely paralleled the South Carolina coastline, bringing heavy rain.
- July 23, 1964 – A tropical depression impacted the state.
- August 30–31, 1964 – Hurricane Cleo moved through the state as a tropical depression, producing several tornadoes.
- September 13, 1964 – Hurricane Dora moved through the state as a tropical storm. Up to 8.25 inches (210 mm) of rain fell in Conway.
- June 16, 1965 – The extratropical remnants of a tropical storm moved through the state.
- June 10, 1966 – Hurricane Alma moved through southern portions of the state as a tropical storm.
- June 8–10, 1968 – Hurricane Abby moved through the state as a tropical depression.
- May 26, 1970 – Hurricane Alma moved through the state as a tropical storm, bringing heavy rain.
- September 11, 1971 – A tropical depression impacted the state.
- June 21, 1972 – Hurricane Agnes moved through the state as a tropical depression, bringing heavy rain.
- August 21, 1976 – Tropical Storm Dottie made landfall near Charleston as a tropical storm, quickly dissipating thereafter.
- September 15, 1976 – A subtropical storm moved through the state.
- September 5, 1977 – The disturbance that became Hurricane Clara formed as a tropical depression near Charleston, moving out to sea shortly after.
- September 8–9, 1977 – Hurricane Babe moved through northern portions of the state as a tropical depression. Up to 7.05 in (179 mm) of rain fell in Caesars Head.
- June 16, 1979 – A tropical depression made landfall near Charleston. Up to 6.89 in (175 mm) of rain fell in Cheraw.
- September 5, 1979 – Hurricane David entered southern South Carolina briefly as a Category 1 hurricane, before weakening to a tropical storm as it passed through central and northern portions of the state. Wind gusts of up to 70 mph (110 km/h) were observed in Hilton Head Island.
- July 3–4, 1981 – A tropical depression impacted the state.
- July 25, 1985 – Hurricane Bob made landfall near Beaufort as a Category 1 hurricane, bringing heavy rain and strong winds. Up to 7.79 in (198 mm) of rain fell in Myrtle Beach.
- November 22, 1985 – Hurricane Kate moved through the state as a tropical storm. Up to 6.56 in (167 mm) of rain fell in Hampton.
- August 15, 1986 – The disturbance that became Hurricane Charley moved through the state, bringing minor rainfall.
- August 28–29, 1988 – Several tornadoes touched down across South Carolina as Tropical Storm Chris moved through the state, one of which resulted in a death in Clarendon County.
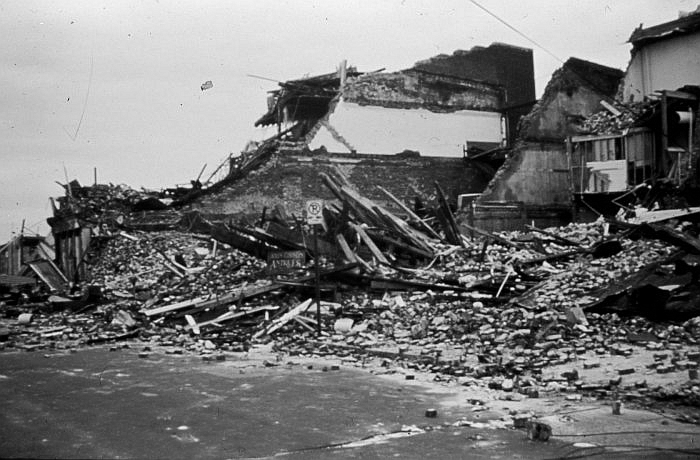
  Damage in Charleston caused by Hurricane Hugo
- September 22, 1989 – Hurricane Hugo made landfall on Sullivan's Island as a Category 4 hurricane with sustained winds of 140 mph (220 km/h). Much of the state received damaging winds, while coastal areas also suffered a devastating storm surge, with water levels reaching 20.2 ft (6.2 m) along Seewee Bay south of McClellanville. In total, 13 direct deaths were reported, and to date, Hugo remains the most recent major hurricane (Note: A major hurricane is a tropical cyclone that ranks as a Category 3 or higher on the Saffir–Simpson scale.) to impact the state.
- October 13, 1990 – The extratropical remnants of Tropical Storm Marco moved through the state. Up to 13.96 in (355 mm) of rain fell in Pageland.
- July 20, 1994 – A tropical depression made landfall near Georgetown.
- August 17, 1994 – Tropical Storm Beryl moved through far western South Carolina as a tropical depression. Up to 17.45 in (443 mm) of rain fell near Lake Jocassee.
- November 21, 1994 – Hurricane Gordon entered the state briefly as a tropical depression, quickly dissipating thereafter.
- June 6, 1995 – The extratropical remnants of Hurricane Allison moved through the state.
- October 8, 1996 – The extratropical remnants of Tropical Storm Josephine moved through the state.
- July 24, 1997 – Hurricane Danny moved through the state as a tropical depression. Several tornadoes touched down as a result of the storm, one of which resulted in a death in Lexington County.
- September 4, 1998 – The extratropical remnants of Hurricane Earl moved through the state.
- September 16, 1999 – Hurricane Floyd brought tropical storm conditions to much of the state whilst paralleling the South Carolina coastline. Up to 16.06 in (408 mm) of rain fell near Myrtle Beach.

=== 2000–present ===
- September 9, 2000 – The extratropical remnants of Hurricane Gordon moved through the state. Up to 10 in (250 mm) of rain fell in Charleston County.
- September 23, 2000 – Tropical Storm Helene moved through the state as a tropical depression. Up to 9.60 in (244 mm) of rain fell in Bamberg, and two deaths were reported.
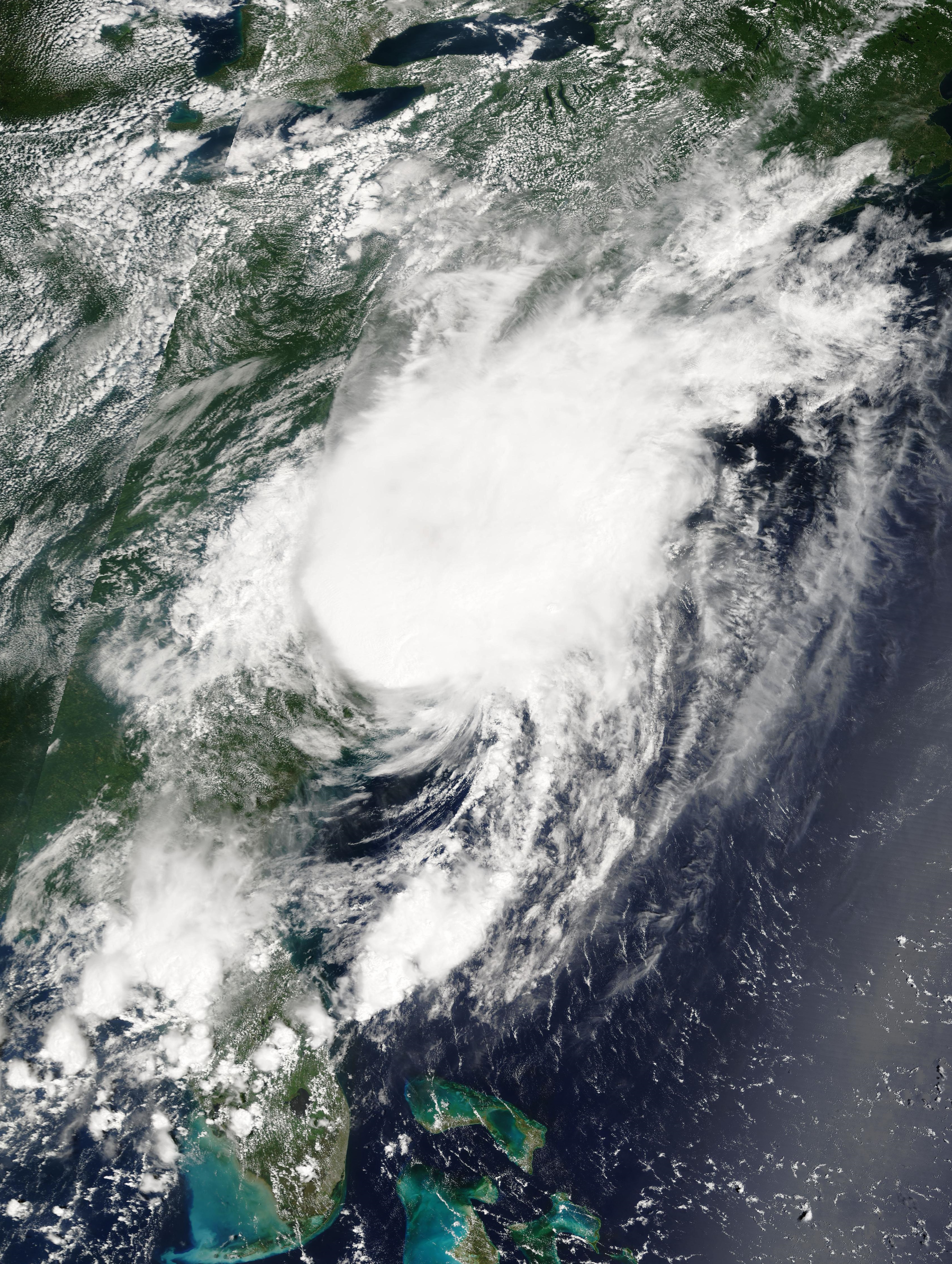
  Hurricane Charley making landfall near North Myrtle Beach, South Carolina
- June 13, 2001 – The extratropical remnants of Tropical Storm Allison moved through the state, producing several tornadoes.
- October 11, 2002 – Hurricane Kyle made landfall near McClellanville as a tropical storm. Up to 6.35 in (161 mm) of rain fell in Edisto Beach.
- August 13, 2004 – Tropical Storm Bonnie moved through the state as a tropical depression. Up to 6.07 in (154 mm) of rain fell in Loris.
- August 14, 2004 – Hurricane Charley made landfall near Cape Romain, and later in North Myrtle Beach, both times as a Category 1 hurricane. The storm produced moderate flooding and wind damage, and one indirect death was reported.
- August 29, 2004 – Hurricane Gaston made landfall near Awendaw as a Category 1 hurricane, bringing heavy rain and strong winds. A wind gust of 81 mph (130 km/h) was observed in Isle of Palms.
- September 28, 2004 – Hurricane Jeanne moved through the state as a tropical depression. One death was reported.
- June 14, 2006 – Tropical Storm Alberto moved through the state as a tropical depression, producing heavy rain and multiple tornadoes.
- June 3, 2007 – The extratropical remnants of Tropical Storm Barry moved through the state. Up to 6.12 in (155 mm) of rain fell near Hardeeville.
- September 6, 2008 – Hurricane Hanna made landfall near the North Carolina and South Carolina border as a tropical storm.
- May 30, 2012 – Tropical Storm Beryl moved through the state as a tropical storm. One death was reported.
- June 7, 2013 – Tropical Storm Andrea moved through the state as a tropical storm. Up to 4.9 in (120 mm) of rain fell near Cordova, and one death was reported after a surfer drowned in Horry County.
- May 5, 2015 – Tropical Storm Ana made landfall near North Myrtle Beach as a tropical storm, producing minor flooding.
- May 29–31, 2016 – Tropical Storm Bonnie made landfall near Isle of Palms as a tropical depression on May 29. Up to 10.43 in (265 mm) of rain fell near Ridgeland.
- September 2–3, 2016 – Hurricane Hermine moved through the state as a tropical storm. Up to 10.72 in (272 mm) of rain fell in Murrells Inlet, and one death was reported.
- October 8, 2016 – Hurricane Matthew made landfall near Cape Romain as a Category 1 hurricane, producing major flooding and strong winds. Over 600,000 people lost power in the state, and in total, four deaths were reported.
- September 15–17, 2018 – Hurricane Florence moved through the state as a tropical storm, causing major flooding. Up to 23.63 in (600 mm) of rain fell near Loris, and four deaths were reported.
- October 11, 2018 – Hurricane Michael moved through the state as a tropical storm, producing multiple weak tornadoes.
- October 20, 2019 – The extratropical remnants of Tropical Storm Nestor moved through the state. Three indirect traffic related deaths were reported as a result of the hazardous conditions.
- May 27, 2020 – Tropical Storm Bertha made landfall near Isle of Palms as a tropical storm. One death was reported in Myrtle Beach after an individual drowned as a result of rip currents.
- July 8, 2020 – A tropical disturbance moved through the state, later moving offshore and becoming Tropical Storm Fay. Up to 12.75 in (324 mm) of rain fell near Hunting Island State Park.
- September 18, 2020 – The extratropical remnants of Hurricane Sally moved through the state, producing several tornadoes.
- June 21, 2021 – Tropical Storm Claudette moved through the state as a tropical depression.
- June 28, 2021 – Tropical Storm Danny made landfall near Hilton Head Island as a minimal tropical storm, dissipating shortly after.
- July 8, 2021 – Hurricane Elsa moved through the state as a tropical storm.
- July 1–2, 2022 – Tropical Storm Colin made landfall near Hunting Island as a minimal tropical storm on July 1. Up to 7.59 in (193 mm) of rain fell near Wadmalaw Island.
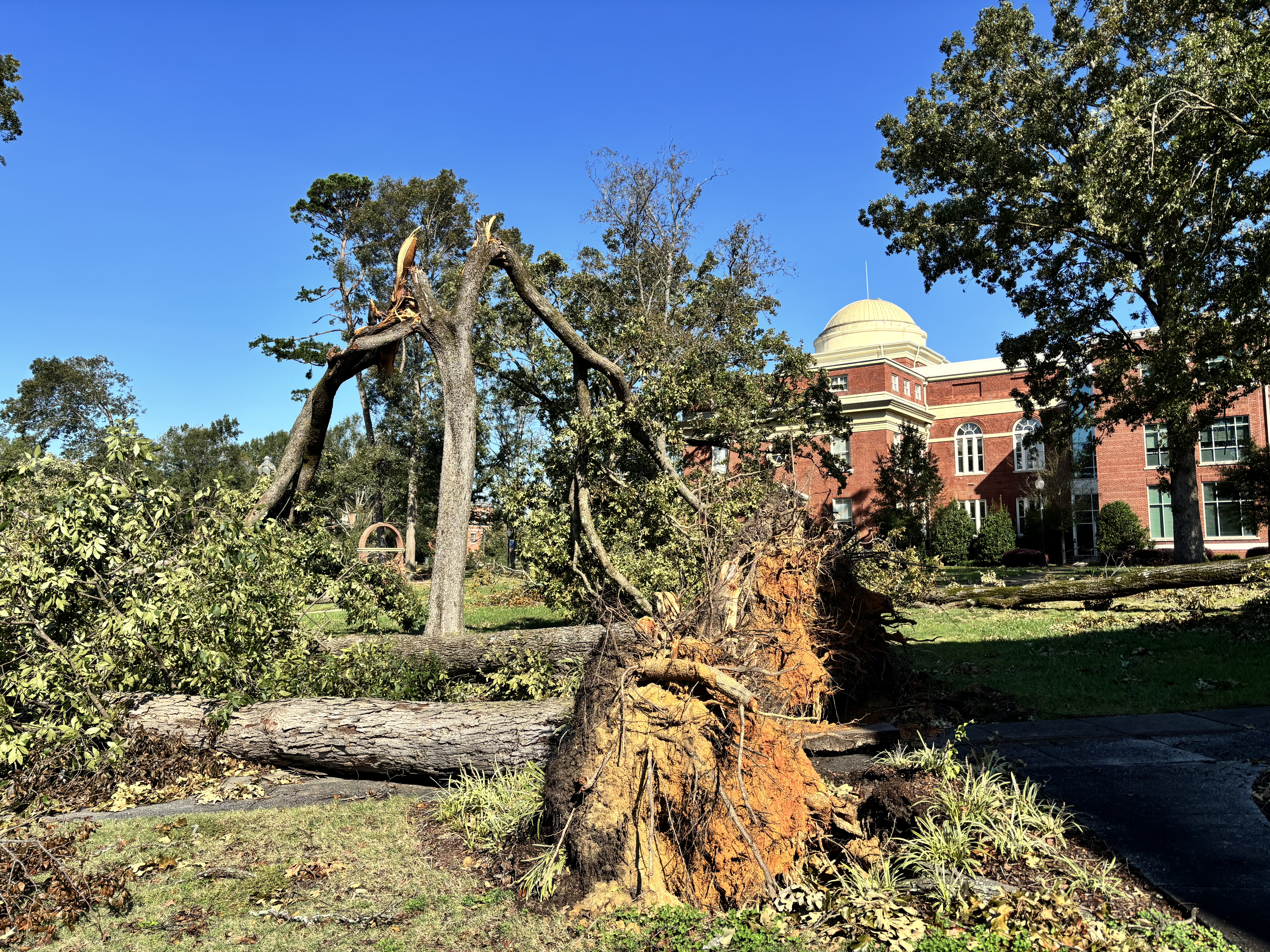
  Uprooted and damaged trees in Clinton following the passage of Helene
- September 30, 2022 – Hurricane Ian made landfall near Georgetown as a Category 1 hurricane. Up to 8.14 in (207 mm) of rain fell in Charleston, and over 210,000 people lost power in the state.
- August 31, 2023 – Hurricane Idalia moved through the state as a tropical storm, producing flooding and multiple tornadoes.
- August 8, 2024 – Hurricane Debby made landfall near Bulls Bay as a tropical storm, producing significant flooding and several tornadoes.
- September 27, 2024 – Hurricane Helene passed near western South Carolina as a tropical storm, bringing flooding, high winds, and several tornadoes. Wind gusts reached 75 mph (121 km/h) in Beaufort, and up to 21.66 in (550 mm) of rain fell in Rocky Bottom. In total, 50 deaths were reported.
- July 6, 2025 – Tropical Storm Chantal made landfall near Litchfield Beach as a tropical storm, producing heavy rain and significant flooding.

== Listed by month ==
South Carolina hurricanes by month
Month	Number of storms
May	6
June	17
July	16
August	21
September	44
October	25
November	3

== Deadly storms ==
The following is a list of tropical cyclones with known deaths in the state.

Name	Year	Number of deaths	Ref
Unnamed	1893	1,000–2,000	
Helene	2024	50	
Unnamed	1940	35	
Unnamed	1885	21	
Unnamed	1911	17	
Unnamed	1893	15	
Hugo	1989	13	
Gracie	1959	10	
Matthew	2016	4	
Florence	2018	4	
Unnamed	1904	3	
Nestor	2019	3	
Able	1952	2	
Helene	2000	2	
Unnamed	1916	1	
Hazel	1954	1	
Cindy	1959	1	
Chris	1988	1	
Danny	1997	1	
Charley	2004	1	
Jeanne	2004	1	
Beryl	2012	1	
Andrea	2013	1	
Hermine	2016	1	
Bertha	2020	1	

== See also ==
- List of United States hurricanes
