= Bulls Bay Light =

Lighthouse in South Carolina, US

Coordinates: 32.9262°N 79.5665°W

- Location: Bulls Island, Charleston County, South Carolina

Tower
- Constructed: 1852 Original; 1900 Second
- Construction: Black lantern on keeper's house
- Height: 35 feet (11 m) Original

Light
- Deactivated: 1913
- Focal height: 44 feet (13 m) Original
- Lens: 4th order Fresnel lens

The Bulls Bay Lighthouse is a former lighthouse on Bulls Island in Charleston County, South Carolina. Its first lighthouse was built in 1852. After it was destroyed in 1897, a new light was built in 1900. It was deactivated in 1913.

Bulls Island is a barrier island that is part of the Cape Romain National Wildlife Refuge. It can be reached by private ferry from Awendaw, South Carolina.

The original lighthouse had its lantern mounted on top of the lightkeeper's brick house. This was destroyed in 1897. It was replaced in 1900 with a metal skeletal tower. The light station was deactivated in 1913.
