= Cape Romain National Wildlife Refuge =

Wildlife refuge in South Carolina, United States

- IUCN category IV (habitat/species management area)
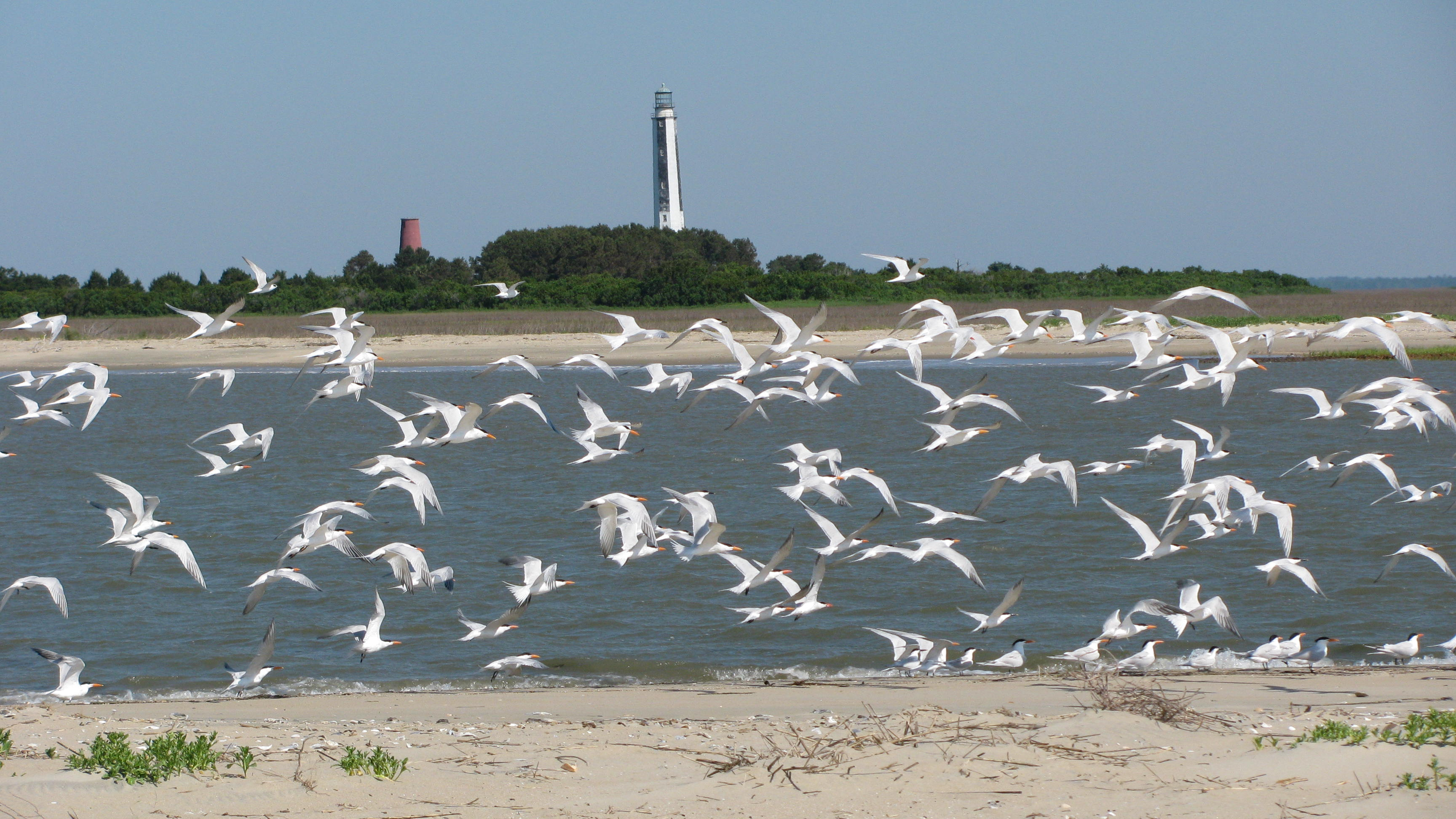

- Location within the United States Location within South Carolina
- Location: Charleston County, South Carolina, United States
- Nearest city: Awendaw
- Coordinates: 32°59′33″N 79°33′50″W
- Area: 66,287 acres (26,825 ha)
- Established: 1932
- Visitors: 154,000 (in 2010)
- Governing body: U.S. Fish and Wildlife Service
- Website: Cape Romain National Wildlife Refuge

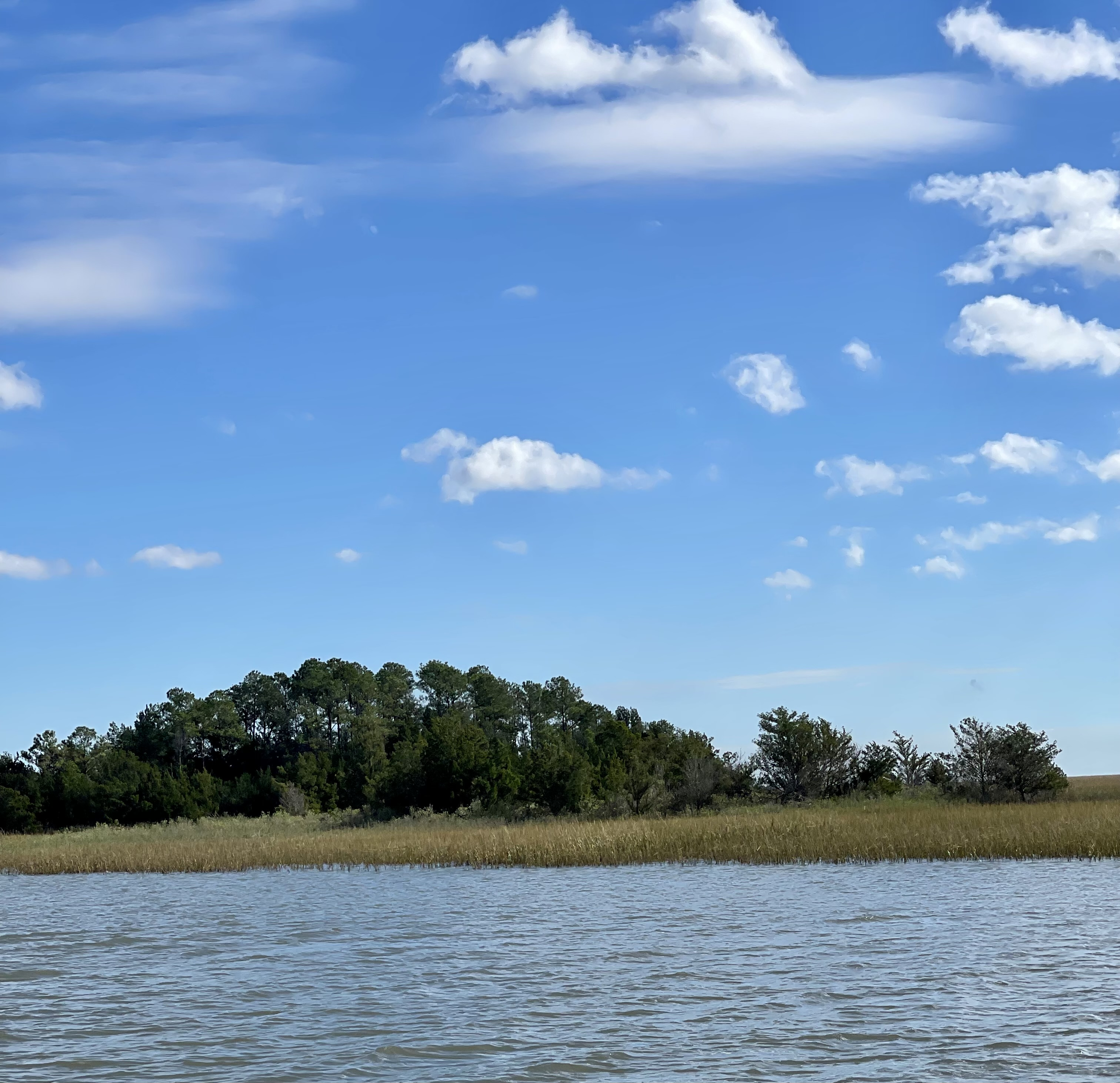
View of the Cape Romain National Wildlife Refuge from the Intracoastal Waterway

The Cape Romain National Wildlife Refuge is a 66,287 acre (267 km²) National Wildlife Refuge in southeastern South Carolina near Awendaw, South Carolina. The refuge lands and waters encompass water impoundments, creeks and bays, emergent salt marsh and barrier islands. 29,000 acres (120 km^{2}) are designated as a wilderness area. Most of the refuge is accessible only by boat. The Intracoastal Waterway passes the Refuge. Mainland facilities include the refuge's headquarters and visitor center which are located on U.S. Highway 17 about 30 minutes by car from Charleston, South Carolina.

== Red wolf ==
In December 1976, two red wolves were released onto Bulls Island in the refuge with the intent of testing and honing reintroduction methods. They were not released with the intent of beginning a permanent population on the island. The first experimental translocation lasted for 11 days, during which a mated pair of red wolves was monitored day and night with remote telemetry. A second experimental translocation was tried in 1978 with a different mated pair, and they were allowed to remain on the island for close to nine months. After that, a larger project was executed in 1987 to reintroduce a permanent population of red wolves back to the wild in the Alligator River National Wildlife Refuge (ARNWR) on the eastern coast of North Carolina. In that year, Bulls Island became the first island breeding site. Pups were raised on the island and relocated to North Carolina until 2005.

== Birds and turtles ==
Established in 1932 as a haven for migratory birds, Cape Romain National Wildlife Refuge is additionally managed for the protection of threatened and endangered species such as the loggerhead sea turtle, wood stork, and piping plover. Every year loggerhead sea turtles bury their eggs on three of the refuge's barrier islands. The refuge supports approximately 23% of the northern subpopulation of loggerhead sea turtles, the largest north of Florida. For the past 30 years refuge employees have helped loggerhead turtles survive by identifying nests that are in areas subject to overwash and inundation, and moving them to a safer area on the island.

== Lighthouse Island ==
Cape Romain National Wildlife Refuge is the site of two surviving historic lighthouses that remain on the refuge, both on Lighthouse Island. The Cape Romain Lighthouses are on the National Register of Historic Places.

== Bull Island ==
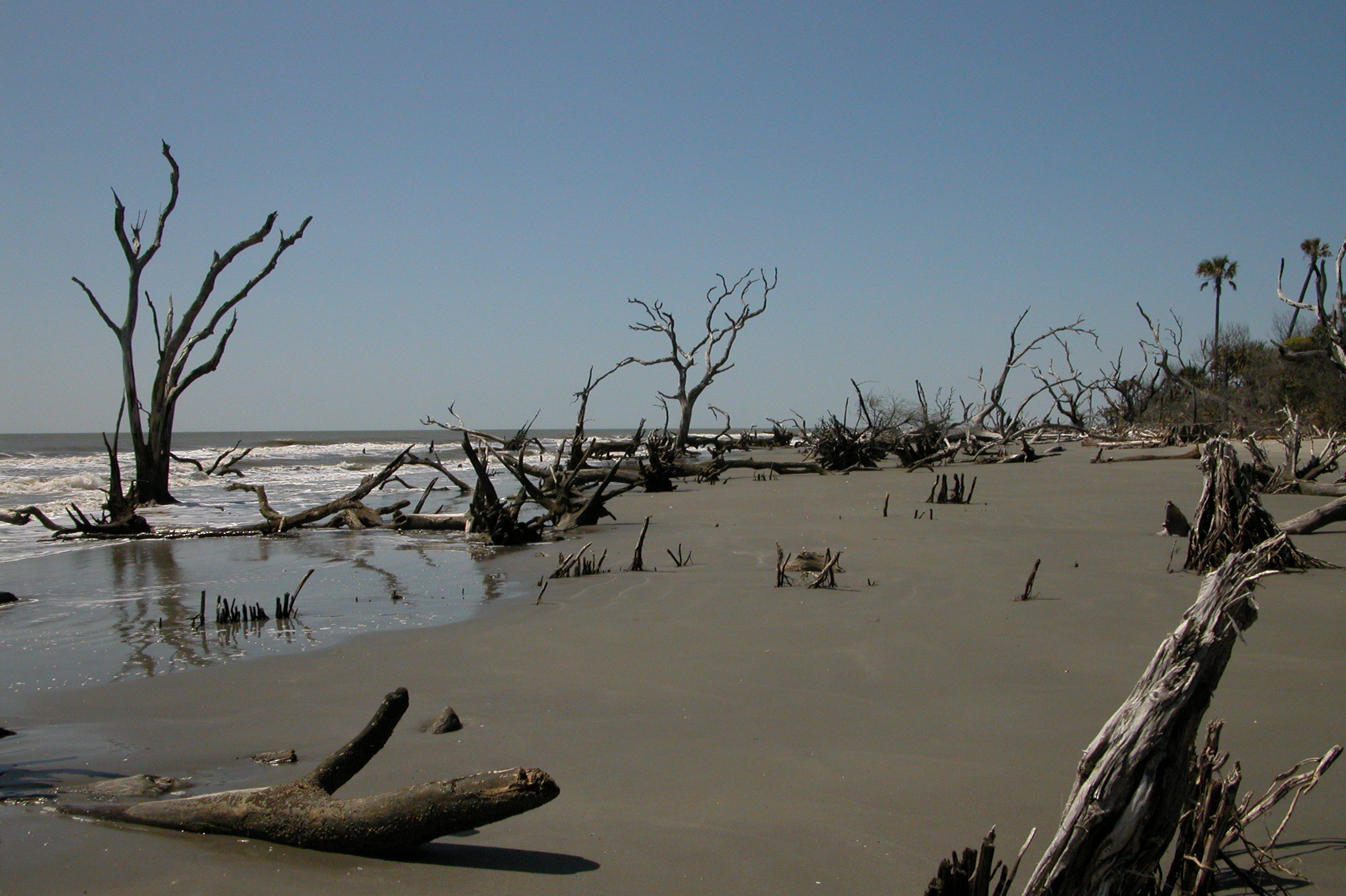
Boneyard beach on Bull Island

Bull Island is at 4,900 acres (20 km^{2}) the largest of the barrier islands that are part of the refuge. A regular ferry service to Bull Island is provided by a private charter service at Garris Landing. The Island was the site of a third lighthouse, Bulls Bay Light which was deactivated in 1913 and lost to the sea years ago. The island also has Boneyard Beach, a beach where a forest has been encroached on by the sea.

== Sewee Visitor & Environmental Education Center ==
The Sewee Center features displays about the various ecosystems, wildlife and heritage of the South Carolina Lowcountry. Exhibits include the marine ecosystems of the Cape Romain National Wildlife Refuge and the forest Center. Other facilities include a classroom/lab, an auditorium with an orientation film, information station, a book store, picnic area and trails. The Center is jointly operated by the U.S. Fish and Wildlife Service and the U.S. Forest Service, and offers nature education programs and activities.

The South Eastern Wildlife and Environment Education Association (SEWEE Association) is the Friends Group for the Cape Romain National Wildlife Refuge and for the Francis Marion National Forest. The SEWEE Association supports the education and conservation activities for the refuge and the forest.
