= Cedar Island, South Carolina =

Island in Georgetown County, South Carolina, United States

Coordinates: 33.154°N 79.277°W

Cedar Island is a river island in the Santee River of South Carolina roughly ten miles long and two miles wide that separates the Santee into two distributaries, the North Santee and the South Santee, before the river empties into the Atlantic Ocean.
