= Accumulated cyclone energy =

Measure of tropical cyclone activity

An example cumulative plot of ACE over the course of a single season in the Atlantic. 2024's hurricane season saw an early flareup of activity including the earliest Category 5 storm on record, an unusual mid-season pause, and a final flareup to end the season.

Accumulated cyclone energy (ACE) is a metric used to compare overall activity of tropical cyclones, utilizing the available records of windspeeds at six-hour intervals to synthesize storm duration and strength into a single index value. The ACE index may refer to a single storm or to groups of storms such as those within a particular month, a full season or combined seasons. It is calculated by summing the square of tropical cyclones' maximum sustained winds, as recorded every six hours, but only for windspeeds of at least tropical storm strength (≥ 34 kn; 63 km/h; 39 mph); the resulting figure is divided by 10,000 to place it on a more manageable scale.

The calculation originated as the Hurricane Destruction Potential (HDP) index, which sums the squares of tropical cyclones' maximum sustained winds while at hurricane strength, at least 64 knots (≥ 119 km/h; 74 mph) at six-hour recorded intervals across an entire season. The HDP index was later modified to further include tropical storms, that is, all wind speeds of at least 34 knots (≥ 63 km/h; 39 mph), to become the accumulated cyclone energy index.

The highest ACE calculated for a single tropical cyclone on record worldwide is 85.26, set by Hurricane Ioke in 2006.

== History ==
The ACE index is an offshoot of Hurricane Destruction Potential (HDP), an index created in 1988 by William Gray and his associates at Colorado State University who argued the destructiveness of a hurricane's wind and storm surge is better related to the square of the maximum wind speed ($v_\max^2$) than simply to the maximum wind speed ($v_\max$). The HDP index is calculated by squaring the estimated maximum sustained wind speeds for tropical cyclones while at hurricane strength, that is, wind speeds of at least 64 knots (≥ 119 km/h; 74 mph). The squared windspeeds from six-hourly recorded intervals are then summed across an entire season. This scale was subsequently modified in 1999 by the United States National Oceanic and Atmospheric Administration (NOAA) to include not only hurricanes but also tropical storms, that is, all cyclones while windspeeds are at least 34 knots (≥ 63 km/h; 39 mph). Since the calculation was more broadly adjusted by NOAA, the index has been used in a number of different ways such as to compare individual storms, and by various agencies and researchers including the Australian Bureau of Meteorology and the India Meteorological Department. The purposes of the ACE index include to categorize how active tropical cyclone seasons were as well as to identify possible long-term trends in a certain area such as the Lesser Antilles.

== Calculation ==
Accumulated cyclone energy is calculated by summing the squares of the estimated maximum sustained wind speeds of tropical and subtropical cyclones when these wind speeds are at least tropical storm strength (≥ 34 kn; 63 km/h; 39 mph) at recorded six-hour intervals (00:00, 06:00, 12:00, and 18:00 UTC). The sums are usually divided by 10,000 to make them more manageable. One unit of ACE equals 10^{4} kn^{2}, and for use as an index the unit is assumed. Thus:

$\text{ACE} = 10^{-4} \sum v_\max^2$ (for $v_\max$ ≥ 34 kn),

where $v_\max$ is estimated sustained wind speed in knots at six-hour intervals.

== Atlantic Ocean ==
Accumulated cyclone energy of North Atlantic hurricanes.

Within the Atlantic Ocean, the United States National Oceanic and Atmospheric Administration and others use the ACE index of a season to classify the season into one of three categories. These three categories are above-normal, near-normal, and below-normal, and are worked out using an approximate tercile partitioning of seasons based on the ACE index over the 70 years between 1951 and 2020. Embedded within the above-normal category is a fourth category, extremely active, which captures seasons of extreme activity. The median value of the ACE index from 1951 to 2020 is 96.7 × 10^{4} kt^{2}.

Classification criteria
Category	ACE Index [kt^{2}]	% of 1951–2020 median
Extremely active	> 159.6	> 165%
Above-normal	> 126.1	> 130%
Near-normal	73.0–126.1	75%–130%
Below-normal	< 73.0	< 75%

Top 10 Atlantic hurricane seasons
Season	TS	HU	MH	ACE
1933	20	11	6	258.57
2005	28	15	7	245.3
1893	12	10	5	231.15
1926	11	8	6	229.56
1995	19	11	5	227.10
2004	15	9	6	226.88
2017	17	10	6	224.88
1950	16	11	6	211.28
1961	12	8	5	188.9
1998	14	10	3	181.76

=== Individual storms in the Atlantic ===
The highest ever ACE estimated for a single storm in the Atlantic is 73.6, for the San Ciriaco hurricane in 1899, a Category 4 hurricane which lasted for four weeks and had an ACE higher than many whole Atlantic storm seasons. Other Atlantic storms with high ACEs include Hurricane Ivan in 2004, with an ACE of 70.4; Hurricane Irma in 2017, with an ACE of 64.9; the Great Charleston Hurricane in 1893, with an ACE of 63.5; Hurricane Isabel in 2003, with an ACE of 63.3; and the 1932 Cuba hurricane, with an ACE of 59.8.

Since 1950, the highest ACE of a tropical storm was Tropical Storm Philippe in 2023, which attained an ACE of 9.4. The highest ACE of a Category 1 hurricane was Hurricane Nadine in 2012, which attained an ACE of 26.3. The record for lowest ACE of a tropical storm is jointly held by Tropical Storm Chris in 2000 and Tropical Storm Philippe in 2017, both of which were tropical storms for only six hours and had an ACE of just 0.1225. The lowest ACE of any hurricane was 2005's Hurricane Cindy, which was only a hurricane for six hours, and 2007's Hurricane Lorenzo, which was a hurricane for twelve hours; Cindy had an ACE of just 1.5175 and Lorenzo had a lower ACE of only 1.475. The lowest ACE of a major hurricane (Category 3 or higher) was Hurricane Gerda in 1969, with an ACE of 5.3. The following table shows those storms in the Atlantic basin from 1851–2021 that have attained over 50 points of ACE.

Storm	Year	Peak classification	ACE	Duration
Hurricane Three	1899	Category 4 hurricane	73.6	28 days
Hurricane Ivan	2004	Category 5 hurricane	70.4	23 days
Hurricane Irma	2017	Category 5 hurricane	64.9	13 days
Hurricane Nine	1893	Category 3 hurricane	63.5	20 days
Hurricane Isabel	2003	Category 5 hurricane	63.3	14 days
Hurricane Fourteen	1932	Category 5 hurricane	59.8	15 days
Hurricane Donna	1960	Category 4 hurricane	57.6	16 days
Hurricane Carrie	1957	Category 4 hurricane	55.8	21 days
Hurricane Inez	1966	Category 5 hurricane	54.6	21 days
Hurricane Sam	2021	Category 4 hurricane	53.8	14 days
Hurricane Luis	1995	Category 4 hurricane	53.7	15 days
Hurricane Allen	1980	Category 5 hurricane	52.3	12 days
Hurricane Esther	1961	Category 5 hurricane	52.2	18 days
Hurricane Matthew	2016	Category 5 hurricane	50.9	12 days

=== Historical ACE in recorded Atlantic hurricane history ===
Records of tropical storms, hurricanes, and major hurricanes before the satellite era (prior to the mid–1960s) are subject to an undercount bias, due to the difficulty of identifying storms.

Classification criteria

Extremely active
Above-normal
Near-normal
Below-normal

Accumulated Cyclone Energy - Atlantic
Season	ACE	TS	HU	MH	Classification
1851	36.24	6	3	1	Below normal
1852	73.28	5	5	1	Near normal
1853	76.49	8	4	2	Near normal
1854	31.00	5	3	1	Below normal
1855	18.12	5	4	1	Below normal
1856	48.94	6	4	2	Below normal
1857	46.84	4	3	0	Below normal
1858	44.79	6	6	0	Below normal
1859	55.73	8	7	1	Below normal
1860	62.06	7	6	1	Below normal
1861	49.71	8	6	0	Below normal
1862	46.03	6	3	0	Below normal
1863	50.35	9	5	0	Below normal
1864	26.55	5	3	0	Below normal
1865	49.13	7	3	0	Below normal
1866	83.65	7	6	1	Near normal
1867	59.97	9	7	1	Below normal
1868	34.65	4	3	0	Below normal
1869	51.02	10	7	1	Below normal
1870	87.8	11	10	2	Near normal
1871	88.39	8	6	2	Near normal
1872	65.38	5	4	0	Below normal
1873	69.47	5	3	2	Below normal
1874	47.05	7	4	0	Below normal
1875	72.48	6	5	1	Below normal
1876	56.05	5	4	2	Below normal
1877	73.36	8	3	1	Near normal
1878	180.85	12	10	2	Extremely active
1879	63.63	8	6	2	Below normal
1880	131.08	11	9	2	Above normal
1881	59.25	7	4	0	Below normal
1882	59.4675	6	4	2	Below normal
1883	66.7	4	3	2	Below normal
1884	72.06	4	4	1	Below normal
1885	58.3	8	6	0	Below normal
1886	166.165	12	10	4	Extremely active
1887	181.26	19	11	2	Extremely active
1888	84.945	9	6	2	Near normal
1889	104.0425	9	6	0	Near normal
1890	33.345	4	2	1	Below normal
1891	116.105	10	7	1	Near normal
1892	115.8375	9	5	0	Near normal
1893	231.1475	12	10	5	Extremely active
1894	135.42	7	5	4	Above normal
1895	68.765	6	2	0	Below normal
1896	136.0825	7	6	2	Above normal
1897	54.54	6	3	0	Below normal
1898	113.2375	11	5	1	Near normal
1899	151.025	10	5	2	Above normal
1900	83.345	7	3	2	Near normal
1901	98.975	13	6	0	Near normal
1902	32.65	5	3	0	Below normal
1903	102.07	10	7	1	Near normal
1904	30.345	6	4	0	Below normal
1905	28.3775	5	1	1	Below normal
1906	162.88	11	6	3	Extremely active
1907	13.06	5	0	0	Below normal
1908	95.11	10	6	1	Near normal
1909	93.34	12	6	4	Near normal
1910	63.9	5	3	1	Below normal
1911	34.2875	6	3	0	Below normal
1912	57.2625	7	4	1	Below normal
1913	35.595	6	4	0	Below normal
1914	2.53	1	0	0	Below normal
1915	130.095	6	5	3	Above normal
1916	144.0125	15	10	5	Above normal
1917	60.6675	4	2	2	Below normal
1918	39.8725	6	4	1	Below normal
1919	55.04	5	2	1	Below normal
1920	29.81	5	4	0	Below normal
1921	86.53	7	5	2	Near normal
1922	54.515	5	3	1	Below normal
1923	49.31	9	4	1	Below normal
1924	100.1875	11	5	2	Near normal
1925	7.2525	4	1	0	Below normal
1926	229.5575	11	8	6	Extremely active
1927	56.4775	8	4	1	Below normal
1928	83.475	6	4	1	Near normal
1929	48.0675	5	3	1	Below normal
1930	49.7725	3	2	2	Below normal
1931	47.835	13	3	1	Below normal
1932	169.6625	15	6	4	Extremely active
1933	258.57	20	11	6	Extremely active
1934	79.0675	13	7	1	Near normal
1935	106.2125	8	5	3	Near normal
1936	99.775	17	7	1	Near normal
1937	65.85	11	4	1	Below normal
1938	77.575	9	4	2	Near normal
1939	43.6825	6	3	1	Below normal
1940	67.79	9	6	0	Below normal
1941	51.765	6	4	3	Below normal
1942	62.485	11	4	1	Below normal
1943	94.01	10	5	2	Near normal
1944	104.4525	14	8	3	Near normal
1945	63.415	11	5	2	Below normal
1946	19.6125	7	3	0	Below normal
1947	88.49	10	5	2	Near normal
1948	94.9775	10	6	4	Near normal
1949	96.4475	16	7	2	Near normal
1950	211.2825	16	11	6	Extremely active
1951	126.325	12	8	3	Above normal
1952	69.08	11	5	2	Below normal
1953	98.5075	14	7	3	Near normal
1954	110.88	16	7	3	Near normal
1955	158.17	13	9	4	Above normal
1956	56.6725	12	4	1	Below normal
1957	78.6625	8	3	2	Near normal
1958	109.6925	12	7	3	Near normal
1959	77.1075	14	7	2	Near normal
1960	72.9	8	4	2	Below normal
1961	188.8975	12	8	5	Extremely active
1962	50.45	7	4	0	Below normal
1963	112.09	10	7	3	Near normal
1964	153.0425	13	7	5	Above normal
1965	86.7175	10	4	1	Near normal
1966	145.2175	15	7	3	Above normal
1967	121.705	13	6	1	Near normal
1968	45.0725	9	5	0	Below normal
1969	149	18	12	3	Above normal
1970	40.18	14	7	2	Below normal
1971	96.5275	13	6	1	Near normal
1972	35.605	7	3	0	Below normal
1973	47.85	8	4	1	Below normal
1974	68.125	11	4	2	Below normal
1975	76.0625	9	6	3	Near normal
1976	84.1725	10	6	2	Near normal
1977	25.3175	6	5	1	Below normal
1978	63.2175	12	5	2	Below normal
1979	92.9175	9	6	2	Near normal
1980	148.9375	11	9	2	Above normal
1981	100.3275	12	7	3	Near normal
1982	31.5025	6	2	1	Below normal
1983	17.4025	4	3	1	Below normal
1984	84.295	13	5	1	Near normal
1985	87.9825	11	7	3	Near normal
1986	35.7925	6	4	0	Below normal
1987	34.36	7	3	1	Below normal
1988	102.9925	12	5	3	Near normal
1989	135.125	11	7	2	Above normal
1990	96.8025	14	8	1	Near normal
1991	35.5375	8	4	2	Below normal
1992	76.2225	7	4	1	Near normal
1993	38.665	8	4	1	Below normal
1994	32.02	7	3	0	Below normal
1995	227.1025	19	11	5	Extremely active
1996	166.1825	13	9	6	Extremely active
1997	40.9275	8	3	1	Below normal
1998	181.7675	14	10	3	Extremely active
1999	176.5275	12	8	5	Extremely active
2000	119.1425	15	8	3	Near normal
2001	110.32	15	9	4	Near normal
2002	67.9925	12	4	2	Below normal
2003	176.84	16	7	3	Extremely active
2004	226.88	15	9	6	Extremely active
2005	245.3	28	15	7	Extremely active
2006	78.535	10	5	2	Near normal
2007	73.885	15	6	2	Near normal
2008	145.7175	16	8	5	Above normal
2009	52.58	9	3	2	Below normal
2010	165.4825	19	12	5	Extremely active
2011	126.3025	19	7	4	Above normal
2012	132.6325	19	10	2	Above normal
2013	36.12	14	2	0	Below normal
2014	66.725	8	6	2	Below normal
2015	62.685	11	4	2	Below normal
2016	141.2525	15	7	4	Above normal
2017	224.8775	17	10	6	Extremely active
2018	132.5825	15	8	2	Above normal
2019	132.2025	18	6	3	Above normal
2020	180.3725	30	14	7	Extremely active
2021	145.5575	21	7	4	Above normal
2022	94.4225	14	8	2	Near normal
2023	145.5565	20	7	3	Above normal
2024	161.5825	18	11	5	Extremely active
2025	130.8	13	5	4	Above normal
2026	19.9	10	1	1	Current season

== Eastern Pacific ==
Most intense Pacific hurricane seasons
Rank	Season	ACE value
1	2026	359.7
2	2018	318.1
3	1992	294.6
4	2015	290.6
5	1990	249.5
6	1978	207.7
7	1983	206.2
8	2014	202.4
9	1993	201.8
10	1984	193.7

Within the Eastern Pacific Ocean, the United States National Oceanic and Atmospheric Administration and others use the ACE index of a season to classify the season into one of three categories. These four categories are extremely active, above-, near-, and below-normal and are worked out using an approximate tercile partitioning of seasons based on the ACE index and the number of tropical storms, hurricanes, and major hurricanes over the 30 years between 1991 and 2020.

For a season to be defined as above-normal, the ACE index criterion and two or more of the other criteria given in the table below must be satisfied.

The mean value of the ACE index from 1991 to 2020 is 108.7 × 10^{4} kt^{2}, while the median value is 97.2 × 10^{4} kt^{2}.

Classification criteria
Category	ACE Index	% of 1991–2020 median	Tropical storms	Hurricanes	Major hurricanes
Extremely active	> 170	> 180%	22 or more	10–16 or more	9–11 or more
Above-normal	111–169	110%–169%	15–19 or more	8 or more	6 or more
Near normal	75–110	75–110%	10–19 or fewer	9 or fewer	2–5 or fewer
Below-normal	< 22–74	< 73%	—N/a		

=== Individual storms in the Pacific ===
The highest ever ACE estimated for a single storm in the Eastern or Central Pacific, while located east of the International Date Line is 62.8, for Hurricane Fico of 1978. Other Eastern Pacific storms with high ACEs include Hurricane John in 1994, with an ACE of 54.0, Hurricane Kevin in 1991, with an ACE of 52.1, Hurricane Hector of 2018, with an ACE of 50.5, and Hurricane Polo of 2026, with an ACE of 50.2.

The following table shows those storms in the Eastern and Central Pacific basins from 1971 through 2026 that have attained over 30 points of ACE.

Storm	Year	Peak classification	ACE	Duration
Hurricane Fico	1978	Category 4 hurricane	62.8	20 days
Hurricane John †	1994	Category 5 hurricane	54.0	19 days
Hurricane Kevin	1991	Category 4 hurricane	52.1	17 days
Hurricane Hector †	2018	Category 4 hurricane	50.5	13 days
Hurricane Polo	2026	Category 5 hurricane	50.2	9 days
Hurricane Dora †	2023	Category 4 hurricane	48.4	12 days
Hurricane Tina	1992	Category 4 hurricane	47.7	22 days
Hurricane Trudy	1990	Category 4 hurricane	45.8	16 days
Hurricane Lowell	2026	Category 5 hurricane	44.4	14 days
Hurricane Lane	2018	Category 5 hurricane	44.2	13 days
Hurricane Dora †	1999	Category 4 hurricane	41.4	13 days
Hurricane Jimena	2015	Category 4 hurricane	40.0	15 days
Hurricane Guillermo	1997	Category 5 hurricane	40.0	16 days
Hurricane Norbert	1984	Category 4 hurricane	39.6	12 days
Hurricane Norman	2018	Category 4 hurricane	36.6	12 days
Hurricane Celeste	1972	Category 4 hurricane	36.3	16 days
Hurricane Sergio	2018	Category 4 hurricane	35.5	13 days
Hurricane Lester	2016	Category 4 hurricane	35.4	14 days
Hurricane Olaf	2015	Category 4 hurricane	34.6	12 days
Hurricane Jimena	1991	Category 4 hurricane	34.5	12 days
Hurricane Doreen	1973	Category 4 hurricane	34.3	16 days
Hurricane Ioke †	2006	Category 5 hurricane	34.2	7 days
Hurricane Marie	1990	Category 4 hurricane	33.1	14 days
Hurricane Orlene	1992	Category 4 hurricane	32.4	12 days
Hurricane Greg	1993	Category 4 hurricane	32.3	13 days
Hurricane Nolo †	2026	Category 4 hurricane	31.5	15 days
Hurricane Hilary	2011	Category 4 hurricane	31.2	9 days
Hurricane Karina	2026	Category 4 hurricane	31.2	10 days
Hurricane Kiko	2025	Category 4 hurricane	30.8	9 days

† – Indicates that the storm formed in the Eastern/Central Pacific, but crossed 180°W at least once; therefore, only the ACE and number of days spent in the Eastern/Central Pacific are included.

=== Historical ACE in recorded Pacific hurricane history ===
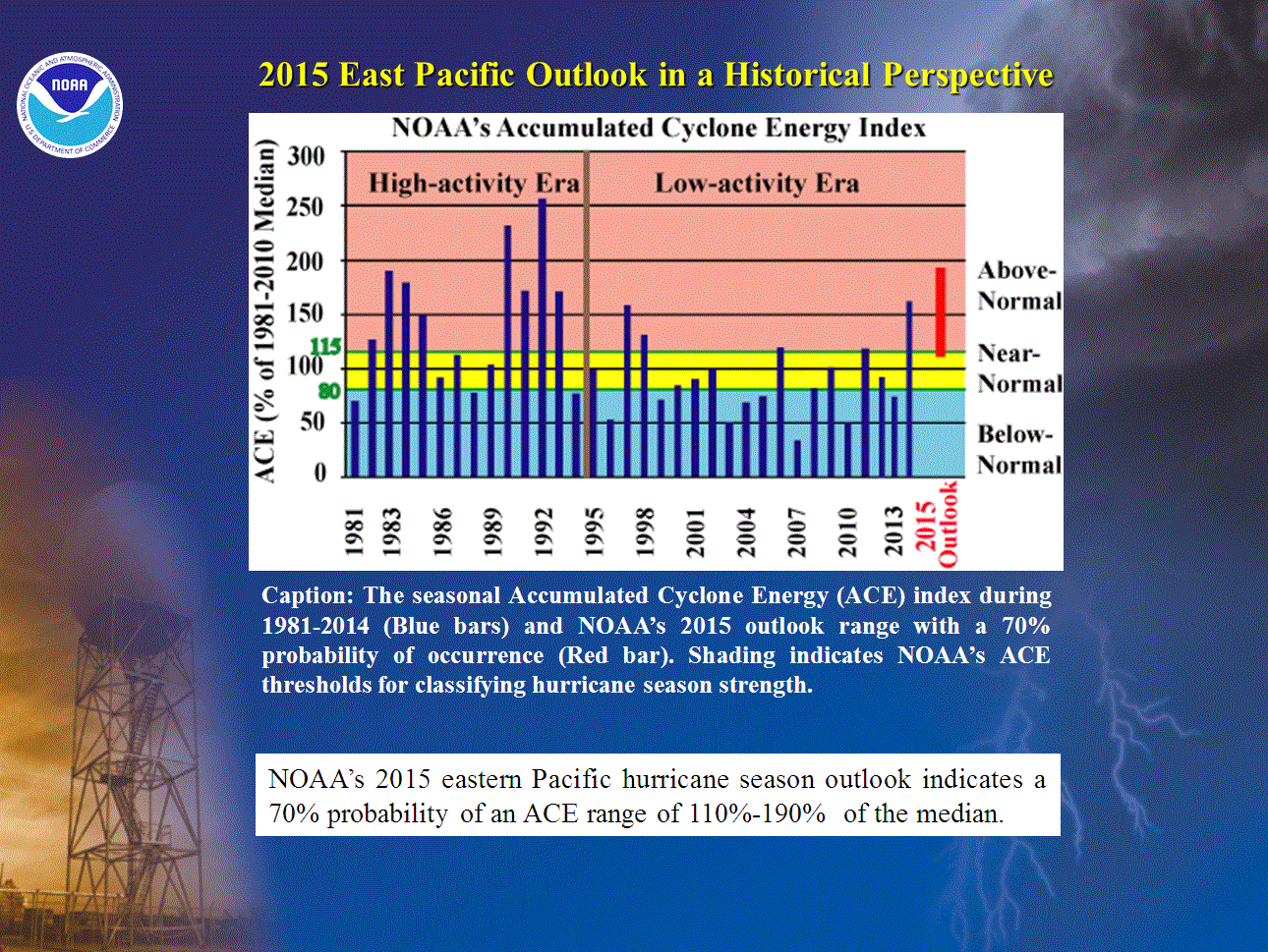
Historical east Pacific seasonal activity, 1981–2015.

Data on ACE is considered reliable starting with the 1971 season.

Classification criteria

Extremely active
Above-normal
Near-normal
Below-normal

Accumulated Cyclone Energy - Pacific
Season	ACE	TS	HU	MH	Classification
1971	139	18	12	6	Above normal
1972	136	14	8	4	Above normal
1973	114	12	7	3	Above normal
1974	90	18	11	3	Near normal
1975	112	17	9	4	Above normal
1976	121	15	9	5	Above normal
1977	22.3	8	4	0	Below normal
1978	207.7	19	14	7	Extremely active
1979	57.4	10	6	4	Below normal
1980	77	14	7	3	Near normal
1981	72.8	15	8	1	Below normal
1982	161	23	12	5	Above normal
1983	206.2	21	12	8	Extremely active
1984	193.7	21	13	7	Extremely active
1985	193.1	24	13	8	Extremely active
1986	107	17	9	3	Near normal
1987	132	20	10	4	Above normal
1988	127.5	15	7	3	Above normal
1989	110	17	9	4	Near normal
1990	249.5	21	16	6	Extremely active
1991	178.9	14	10	5	Extremely active
1992	294.6	27	16	10	Extremely active
1993	201.8	15	11	9	Extremely active
1994	185.2	20	10	5	Extremely active
1995	100.2	10	7	3	Near normal
1996	53.5	9	5	2	Below normal
1997	167.9	19	9	7	Above normal
1998	134	13	9	6	Above normal
1999	90.2	9	6	2	Near normal
2000	95.9	19	6	2	Near normal
2001	90.6	15	8	2	Near normal
2002	124.4	15	8	6	Above normal
2003	56.6	16	7	0	Below normal
2004	71.1	12	6	3	Below normal
2005	96.6	15	7	2	Near normal
2006	156.9	19	11	6	Above normal
2007	52.6	11	4	1	Below normal
2008	83.8	17	7	2	Near normal
2009	126.4	20	8	5	Above normal
2010	51	8	3	2	Below normal
2011	120.9	11	10	6	Above normal
2012	98.5	17	10	5	Near normal
2013	74.9	20	9	1	Below normal
2014	202.4	22	16	9	Extremely active
2015	290.6	26	16	11	Extremely active
2016	184.8	22	13	6	Extremely active
2017	100.8	18	9	4	Near normal
2018	318.1	23	13	10	Extremely active
2019	97.6	19	7	4	Near normal
2020	77.2	17	4	3	Near normal
2021	94.5	19	8	2	Near normal
2022	114.6	19	10	4	Above normal
2023	165.9	17	10	8	Above normal
2024	84.6	14	5	3	Near normal
2025	127.3	20	11	5	Above normal
2026	359.7	25	13	11	Current season Extremely active

== Western Pacific ==
=== Historical ACE in recorded Pacific typhoon history ===
Data on ACE starts with the 1977 season.

Accumulated Cyclone Energy - West Pacific Average: 213.37 units
Season	ACE	TS	TY	VSTY	VITY
1977	156.048	21	11	5	4
1978	223.724	30	16	3	2
1979	232.838	24	12	8	4
1980	204.253	24	15	11	2
1981	195.598	29	13	6	2
1982	296.92	25	19	13	2
1983	174.342	23	10	6	6
1984	210.938	27	16	8	2
1985	195.598	28	15	3	1
1986	279.867	29	19	11	3
1987	285.143	23	17	9	5
1988	169.691	31	11	6	0
1989	244.48	32	20	9	0
1990	264.733	31	19	6	2
1991	309.452	30	17	9	2
1992	305.62	31	16	12	1
1993	184.983	28	15	6	1
1994	311.096	36	20	11	3
1995	131.718	24	8	6	1
1996	215.745	29	16	7	0
1997	321.068	28	16	11	3
1998	88.488	16	8	2	1
1999	71.536	20	5	1	0
2000	161.835	23	13	6	1
2001	189.165	26	16	6	1
2002	252.366	26	15	11	0
2003	201.14	21	14	8	1
2004	313.24	29	19	12	1
2005	214.154	23	13	9	1
2006	240.563	23	15	11	5
2007	159.242	24	14	8	2
2008	131.096	22	11	6	2
2009	201.406	22	13	7	3
2010	86.727	14	7	4	1
2011	154.426	21	8	6	1
2012	223.331	25	14	7	2
2013	201.188	31	13	8	5
2014	201.146	23	11	8	5
2015	354.884	27	18	16	4
2016	185.812	26	13	10	5
2017	141.619	27	11	3	0
2018	252.265	29	13	9	7
2019	209.106	29	17	9	4
2020	119.171	23	10	7	2
2021	175.776	22	9	6	4
2022	129.457	25	10	5	2
2023	192.506	17	10	8	3
2024	168.661	26	13	8	3
2025	157.497	27	13	5	1
2026	304.2	32	15	12	4

== North Indian ==
There are various agencies over the North Indian Ocean that monitor and forecast tropical cyclones, including the United States Joint Typhoon Warning Center, as well as the Bangladesh, Pakistan and India Meteorological Department. As a result, the track and intensity of tropical cyclones differ from each other, and as a result, the accumulated cyclone energy also varies over the region. However, the India Meteorological Department has been designated as the official Regional Specialised Meteorological Centre by the WMO for the region and has worked out the ACE for all cyclonic systems above 17 knots (31 km/h; 20 mph) based on their best track analysis which goes back to 1982.

Top 5 North Indian Ocean cyclone seasons
Season	D	DD	CS	SCS	VSCS	ESCS	SUCS	ACE
2019	12	11	8	6	6	3	1	93
2023	9	7	6	5	4	3	0	57.5
2007	11	8	4	2	2	2	1	46.1
2013	10	6	5	4	3	1	0	45.6
1999	10	8	5	3	3	2	1	44.3

== See also ==
- Atlantic hurricane
- Cyclone Freddy – Produced the second-highest accumulated cyclone energy amount worldwide
- Hurricane/Typhoon Ioke - The most ACE producing tropical cyclone on record, most in the Northern Hemisphere
- Saffir–Simpson scale – Alternative intensity scale
