= 1893 Great Charleston hurricane =

Category 3 Atlantic hurricane

Hurricane Nine 1893 Great Charleston hurricane
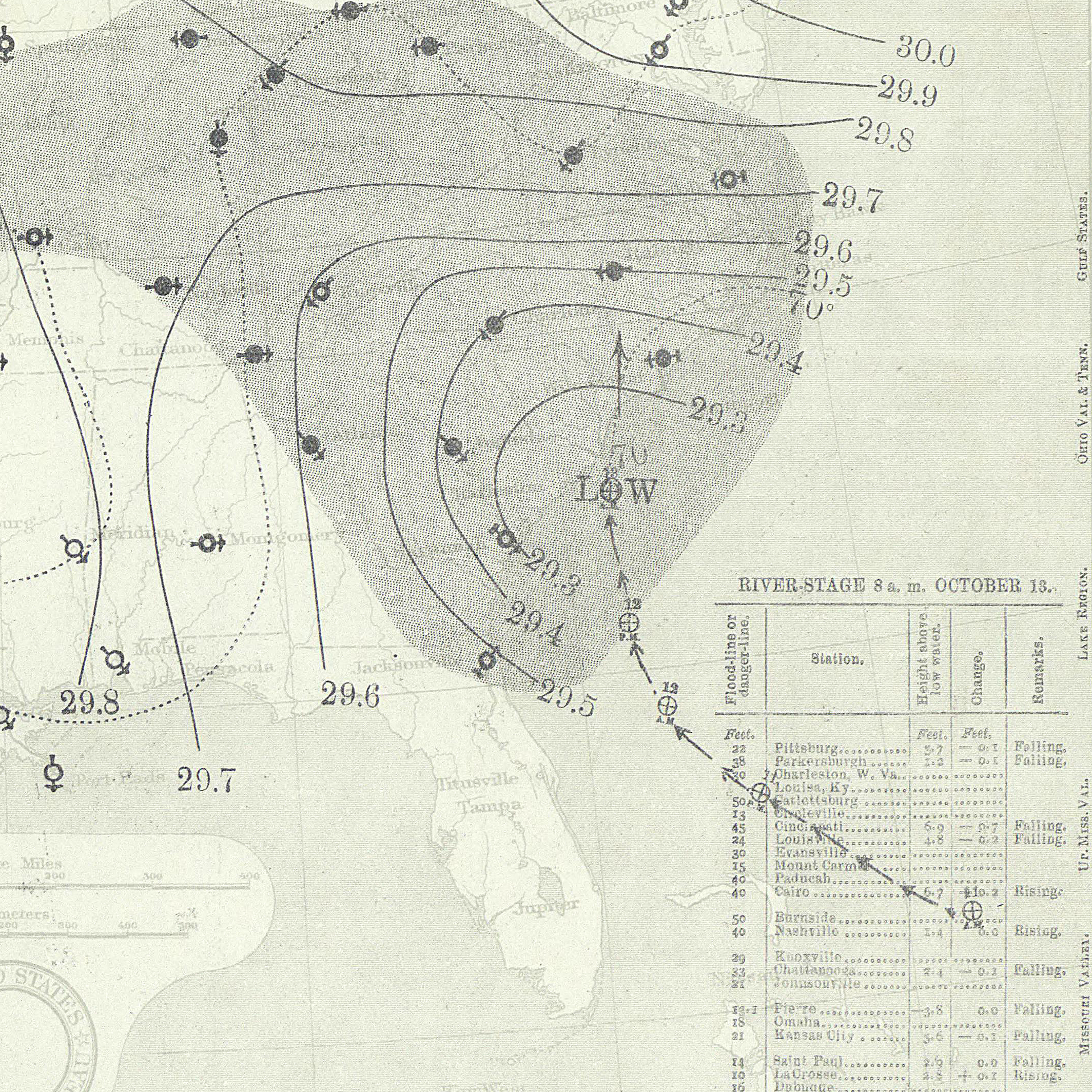
- Surface weather analysis of the hurricane nearing landfall in South Carolina on October 13

Meteorological history
- Formed: September 25, 1893
- Dissipated: October 14, 1893

Category 3 major hurricane
- 1-minute sustained (SSHWS/NWS)
- Highest winds: 120 mph (195 km/h)
- Lowest pressure: 954 mbar (hPa); 28.17 inHg

Overall effects
- Fatalities: 110
- Damage: Millions
- Areas affected: The Bahamas, East Coast of the United States, New England, Eastern Canada
- Part of the 1893 Atlantic hurricane season

The 1893 Great Charleston hurricane compounded the effects of the deadly Sea Islands hurricane in August and proceeded to impact areas as far north as Ontario. The ninth known tropical cyclone, ninth hurricane, and fourth major hurricane of the season, (Note: A major hurricane is a storm that ranks as Category 3 or higher on the Saffir–Simpson hurricane wind scale.) this system was first observed south of the Cabo Verde Islands on September 25. It moved westward and intensified into a hurricane on September 28, before turning northwestward on October 2. By then, the system strengthened into a Category 3 hurricane and likely peaked with maximum sustained winds of 120 mph (195 km/h). The hurricane then moved west-northwestward for several days, beginning on October 6. After passing just north of the Abaco Islands on October 12, the storm curved northwestward and then north-northwestward, remaining closely offshore Florida and Georgia. The hurricane then turned northeastward, and on October 13, it made landfall near McClellanville, South Carolina, winds of 120 mph (195 km/h). Moving rapidly northward from North Carolina into eastern Canada, the system became extratropical over far southern Quebec on October 14 and dissipated over the northeastern portions of the province on the following day.

In the Bahamas, abnormally high tides inundated some streets on New Providence and nearby Hog Island (modern-day Paradise Island), sweeping away the home of the assistant lighthouse keeper. The storm severely damaged pineapple cultivation facilities on Eleuthera and plantations on the Abaco Islands, where many other buildings were destroyed. In Florida, storm surge reached several feet above ground between Palm Beach and Jacksonville, while heavy rains fell, leading to flooding in a number of coastal communities. Coastal flooding impacted South Carolina from Georgetown southward, though the worst occurred between Winyah Bay and Murrells Inlet. The National Hurricane Center lists the combined death toll for Florida and South Carolina at 28. North Carolina reported extensive damage to crops, trees, homes, and shipping, as well as 22 fatalities. Many towns across Virginia, the Mid-Atlantic, New England, and Ontario experienced wind damage and some coastal and freshwater flooding. In Maryland, the storm caused two indirect deaths and about $1 million in damage in Baltimore alone. (Note: All damage figures are in 1893 USD, unless otherwise noted) Inside the Great Lakes, the storm capsized nearly 40 vessels, leading to a loss of 54 lives. Four other people died in Buffalo, New York. Overall, 110 deaths are attributed to the storm.

== Meteorological history ==
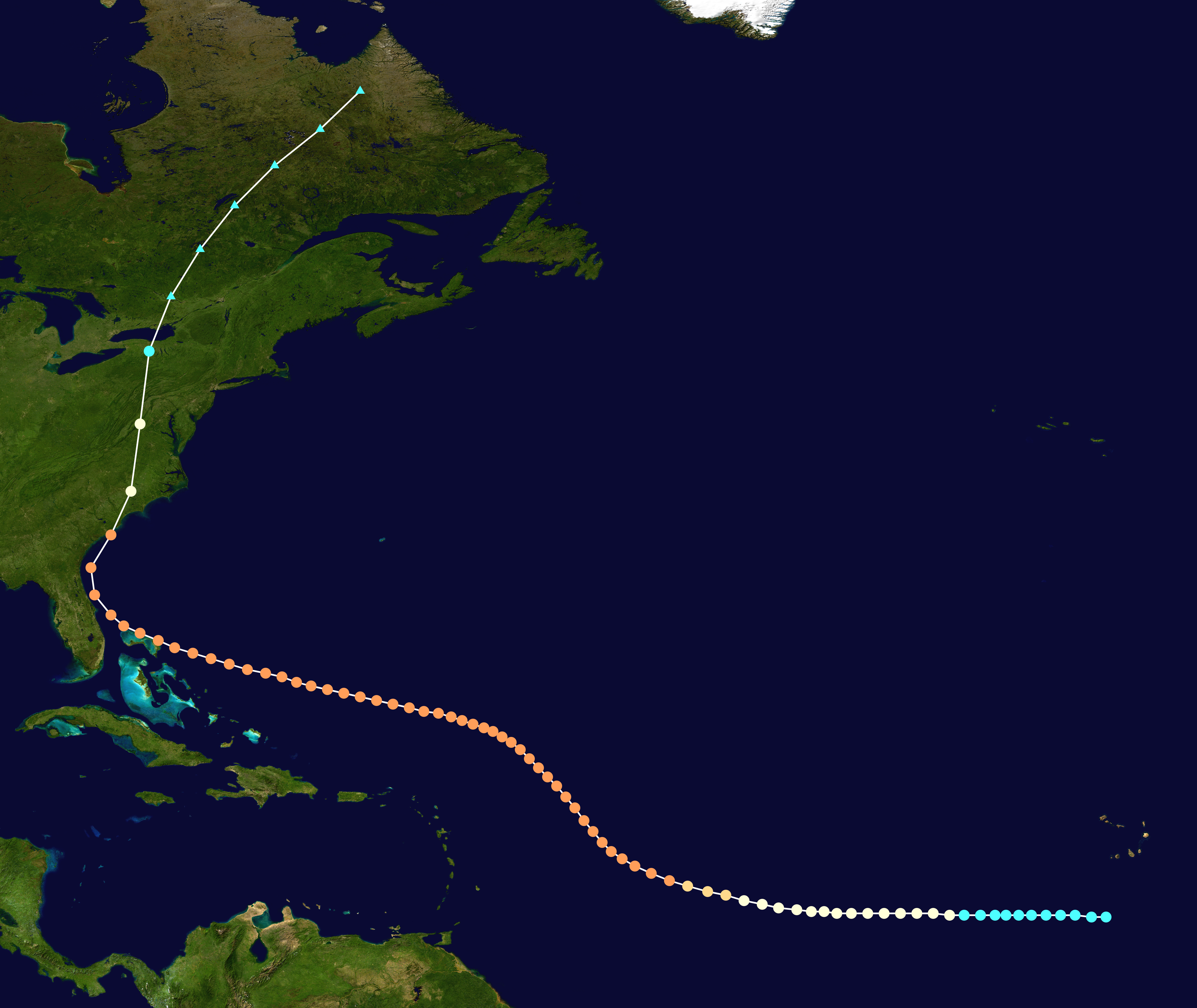
Map plotting the storm's track and intensity, according to the Saffir–Simpson scale Map key Saffir–Simpson scale Tropical depression (≤38 mph, ≤62 km/h) Tropical storm (39–73 mph, 63–118 km/h) Category 1 (74–95 mph, 119–153 km/h) Category 2 (96–110 mph, 154–177 km/h) Category 3 (111–129 mph, 178–208 km/h) Category 4 (130–156 mph, 209–251 km/h) Category 5 (≥157 mph, ≥252 km/h) Unknown Storm type Tropical cyclone Subtropical cyclone Extratropical cyclone, remnant low, tropical disturbance, or monsoon depression

Meteorologist Charles J. Mitchell of the Weather Bureau noted in 1924 that this storm was first observed over the far eastern Atlantic at 11°0′N 26°0′W on September 25. Consequently, the Atlantic hurricane database begins the track of this cyclone at 06:00 UTC on that day at 11°6′N 25°0′W, approximately 275 mi (445 km) south-southwest of the westernmost islands of Cabo Verde. Initially a tropical storm, the system moved westward and intensified into a hurricane on September 28 and a Category 2 hurricane on the modern-day Saffir–Simpson scale on October 1. By the following day, the cyclone began a northwestward motion. The hurricane is also estimated to have strengthened into a Category 3 hurricane on October 2 and reached maximum sustained winds of 120 mph (195 km/h) shortly thereafter. The hurricane then moved west-northwestward for several days, beginning on October 6. After passing just north of the Abaco Islands on October 12, the storm curved northwestward and then north-northwestward. Remaining closely offshore Florida and Georgia, the cyclone passed only about 25 mi (40 km) east of Ormond Beach in the former at 00:00 UTC on October 13.

The hurricane then turned northeastward later on October 13 and at around 13:00 UTC, it made landfall near McClellanville, South Carolina, winds of 120 mph (195 km/h) and an atmospheric pressure of 955 mbar (28.2 inHg). Meteorologist Francis P. Ho estimated both figures in 1989, the latter based on a recorded atmospheric pressure of 959 mbar (28.3 inHg) and a maximum wind radius of 17 mi (27 km) and the sustained winds based on these calculations and the storm's latitude. Moved rapidly northward through North Carolina and the Appalachian Mountains, the cyclone was still a Category 1 hurricane as it passed 60 mi (95 km) west of Washington, D.C. The storm transitioned into an extratropical cyclone over far southern Quebec on October 14 after crossing Lake Ontario and continued northeastward until dissipating over the northeastern portions of the province on the following day. Overall, the hurricane achieved an accumulated cyclone energy rating of 63.5, (Note: Accumulated cyclone energy (ACE) is a metric used to express the energy used by a tropical cyclone during its lifetime. Therefore, a storm with a longer duration will have higher values of ACE. It is only calculated at six-hour increments in which specific tropical and subtropical systems are either at or above sustained wind speeds of 39 mph (63 km/h), which is the threshold for tropical storm intensity.) one of the highest values ever recorded.

== Impact ==
Although the storm remained far away from the Lesser Antilles, Antigua reported sustained winds up to 27 mph (43 km/h). In the Bahamas, abnormally high tides inundated some streets on New Providence and nearby Hog Island, sweeping away the home of the assistant lighthouse keeper. The storm severely damaged pineapple cultivation facilities on Eleuthera and plantations on the Abaco Islands, where many other buildings were destroyed.

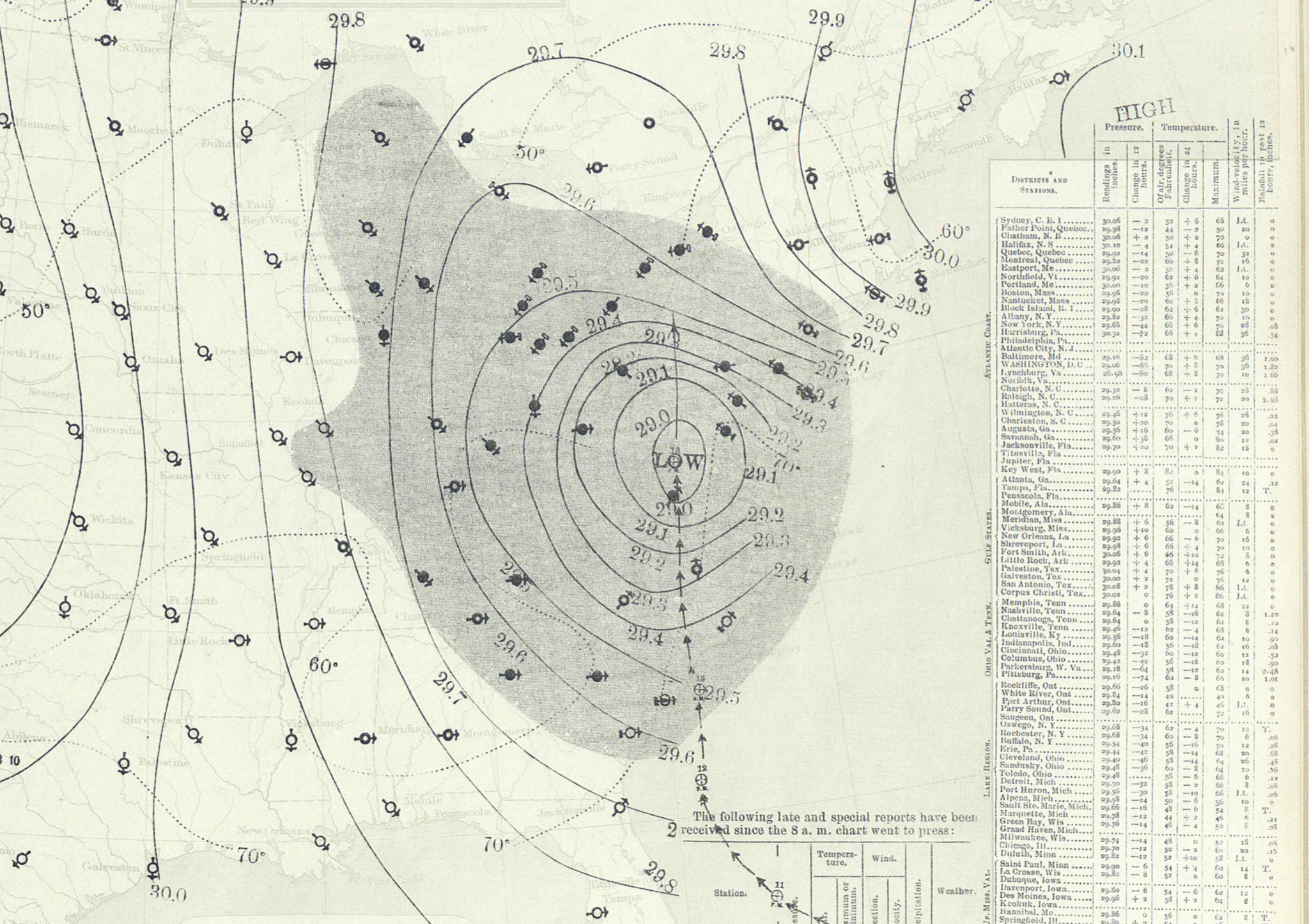
Map of the hurricane rapidly entering the Mid-Atlantic on October 13

In Florida, storm surge reached several feet above ground between Palm Beach and Jacksonville, while heavy rains fell, leading to flooding in a number of coastal communities. The highest known sustained wind speed in Florida was 78 mph (126 km/h) in Titusville. Sebastian reported gusts of 90 mph (140 km/h). Tides reached their highest heights in St. Augustine since 1824, while the Matanzas and San Sebastian rivers merged for the first time in 22 years. The hurricane reportedly downed all telegraph and telephone lines. Floodwaters also invaded many homes and streets. Sustained winds in Jacksonville peaked at 48 mph (77 km/h), and the St. Johns River crested at its highest height there in several years. Some cottages sustained damage in the city. In Georgia, although the "sea ran heaviest for years" at Savannah according to a report by the Weather Bureau, sustained winds there reached 40 mph (64 km/h) and only minor impact occurred.

A 2006 reanalysis of cyclones in South Carolina concluded that the hurricane was likely compact. Therefore, Charleston probably experienced not much worse than tropical storm conditions, with impact mainly limited to toppled power, telegraph, and telephone lines and downed trees blocking a road. The Battery and some western parts of the city were inundated with about 1 to 2 ft (0.30 to 0.61 m) of ocean water. Extensive storm surge damage occurred between South Island – at the south end of Winyah Bay – and Murrells Inlet. Near the latter, the community of Magnolia Beach reported the loss of many coastal homes, while those that remained suffered substantial damage. Tides on Pawleys Island rose at least 5 ft (1.5 m), leaving about 2 ft (0.61 m) of water inside homes. Storm surge and abnormally high tides in Georgetown, exceeded the heights of those measured in the August hurricane. Consequently, the entire waterfront flooded and merchandise stored in warehouses were damaged. Also in that city, sustained winds reached about 90 mph (140 km/h), the highest recorded in South Carolina even though the storm struck the state as a Category 3 hurricane. At least 15 deaths occurred in the state, while the National Hurricane Center lists the combined toll for Florida and South Carolina at 28. However, other sources note that 19 fatalities occurred along the coast of South Carolina.

North Carolina suffered "great destruction ... to forests, crops and property, and to shipping", according to a 2000 report by National Weather Service meteorologist James E. Hudgins. Sustained winds in the state peaked at 93 mph (150 km/h) at Southport. The Southport Leader noted that "from one of town to the one the harbor front presents a desolate appearance strewn as it with timber, boats, and the wreckage of wharves, fish houses, and other buildings." Although many other instances of damage occurred throughout the town, that newspaper estimated that only small monetary losses occurred overall. Waves reached the then-record highest height in Wilmington, causing about $150,000 in damage to the waterfront. Although sustained winds reached only 36 mph (58 km/h) in Raleigh, the atmospheric pressure fell to about 970.5 mbar (28.66 inHg), then the lowest ever recorded in North Carolina. Significant agricultural losses occurred in the vicinity of Raleigh, but many crops had already been harvested. The area also reported many downed trees and power lines and badly damaged some buildings. A total of 22 fatalities were reported in North Carolina.

Strong winds in Virginia partially deroofed homes and downed several trees in Richmond. Two trains struck fallen trees between Richmond and Danville. Heavy rainfall caused the Roanoke River to rise to its highest level within the memory of residents and expand to a width of about 0.75 mi (1.21 km). At the West End, several families evacuated from a row of cottages after floodwaters began entering the first floors. Overall, 40 homes in the West End suffered flood damage. Near Elliston, approximately 1,000 ft (300 m) of Norfolk and Western Railway was washed out. Stone Gap observed 2.98 in (76 mm) during the course of one day, the highest 24-hour total in the month of October at that location. Many residences within the city washed away. The storm destroyed barns and outhouses and toppled many electrical lines in Petersburg. High tides destroyed the wharves at Alexandria, causing about $25,000 in damage, and capsized the Edward Ewing. Gale-force winds downed trees, limbs, and a church wall in Washington, D.C. The toppling of the church wall resulted in about $3,000 in damage. Four vessels suffered damage or capsized. The Potomac River rose to 6 ft (1.8 m) above high tide, submerging the Anacostia Bridge. Henry B. Brown, an Associate Justice of the Supreme Court, suffered a serious injury after a plate glass window shattered at his house. Winds also downed a number of trees and limbs throughout the city.

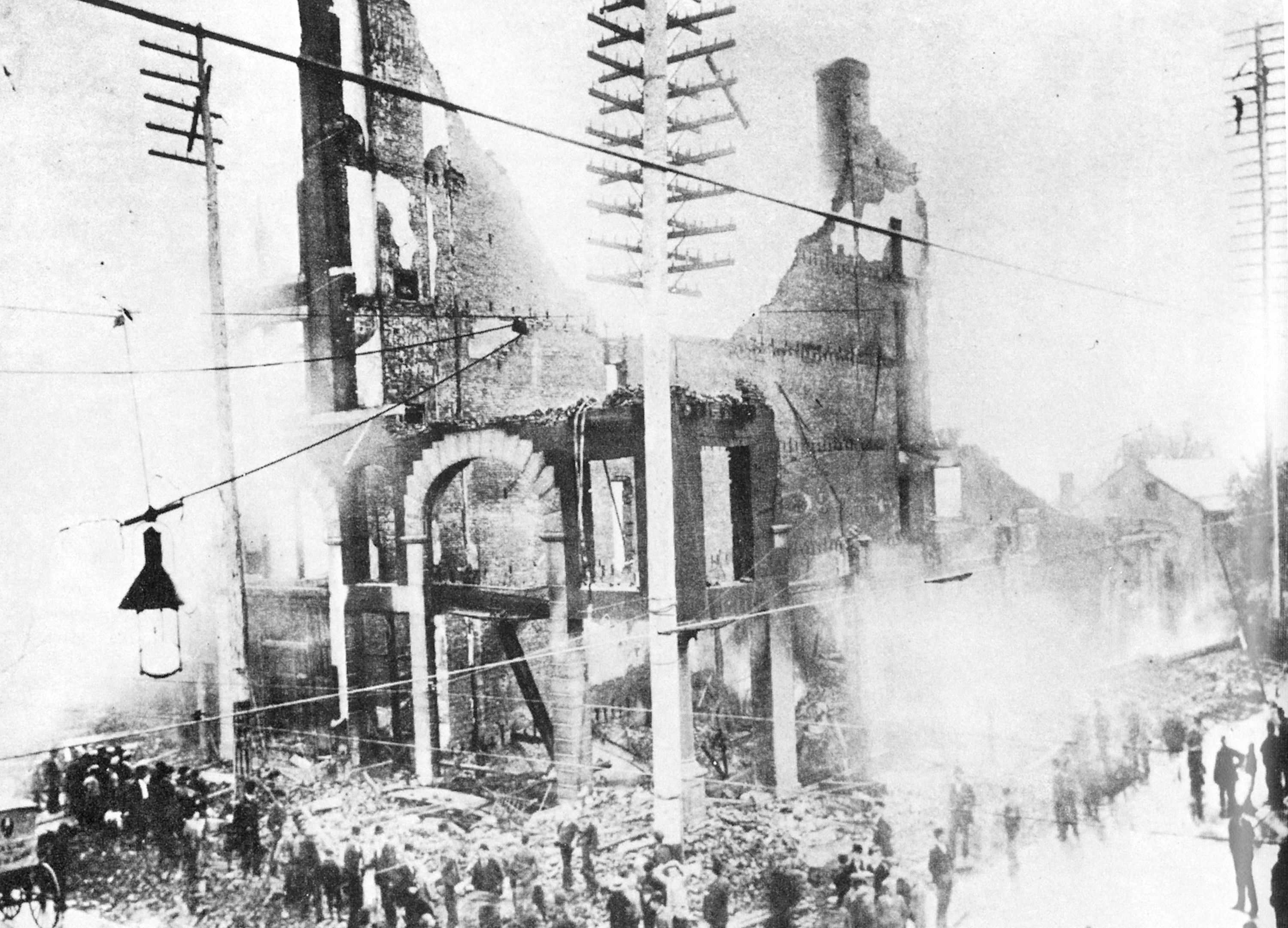
A building in Allentown, Pennsylvania, damaged by a fire ignited by the storm

In Maryland, a fire ignited at the electrical plant in Baltimore when a downed wire made contact with a wooden section of the building, ultimately destroying the facility for a loss of about $125,000. Two prisoners died after the fire spread to the jail. Along the coast, tides swept away several bridges and wharves. Dozens of warehouses flooded and numerous low-lying streets were submerged. Baltimore's canning district suffered about $50,000 in damage. Throughout the city, damage totaled about $1 million. Winds downed fences and partly deroofed some residences in Bladensburg, while Cumberland, Solomons and Woodstock also experienced severe property damage. Well east of Cumberland, a train ran into a section of track where a landslide had occurred. Initial reports indicated that two engineers died as a result of this incident, but both survived. In Delaware, the Christina River overflowed at Wilmington, flooding southern parts of the city. Residents in that section of Wilmington had to be rescued from the second floors of their homes.

Several Pennsylvania towns reported downed trees, unroofed dwellings, disrupted telegraph service, and delayed traffic on railroads, including in Bethlehem, Carlisle, Chambersburg, Chester, Columbia, Easton, Erie, Harrisburg, Huntingdon, Kilmer, Lewisburg, Mifflintown, Norristown, Pine Grove, Pittsburgh, Reading, Stroudsburg, West Chester, and Westtown. Philadelphia observed sustained winds of 50 mph (80 km/h) and gusts of 60 mph (97 km/h), causing minor damage. A fire ignited in Allentown after sustained winds of about 40 mph (64 km/h) caused telephone and electric wires to become crossed. The blaze, described by the Boston Sunday Post as "the most disastrous fire in the history of Allentown" caused approximately $300,000 in damage. A fire ignited under similar circumstances in Wilkes-Barre, leading to about $30,000 in damage after burning several floors of a telephone exchange. In New Jersey, the storm washed out several parts of the West Jersey Railroad, downed many telegraph wires, and beached several vessels. The hurricane downed nearly all telegraph and telephone wires at Asbury Park. Many wires fell in Jersey City area, where the hurricane also toppled a number of signs and trees and capsized many vessels, including yachts at Greenville Shore. Four buildings were destroyed in Belvidere, including a factory, causing about $25,000 in losses. In Cape May, the storm downed many trees and the ocean pier pavilion. Hundreds of acres along the Maurice River south of Millville flooded.

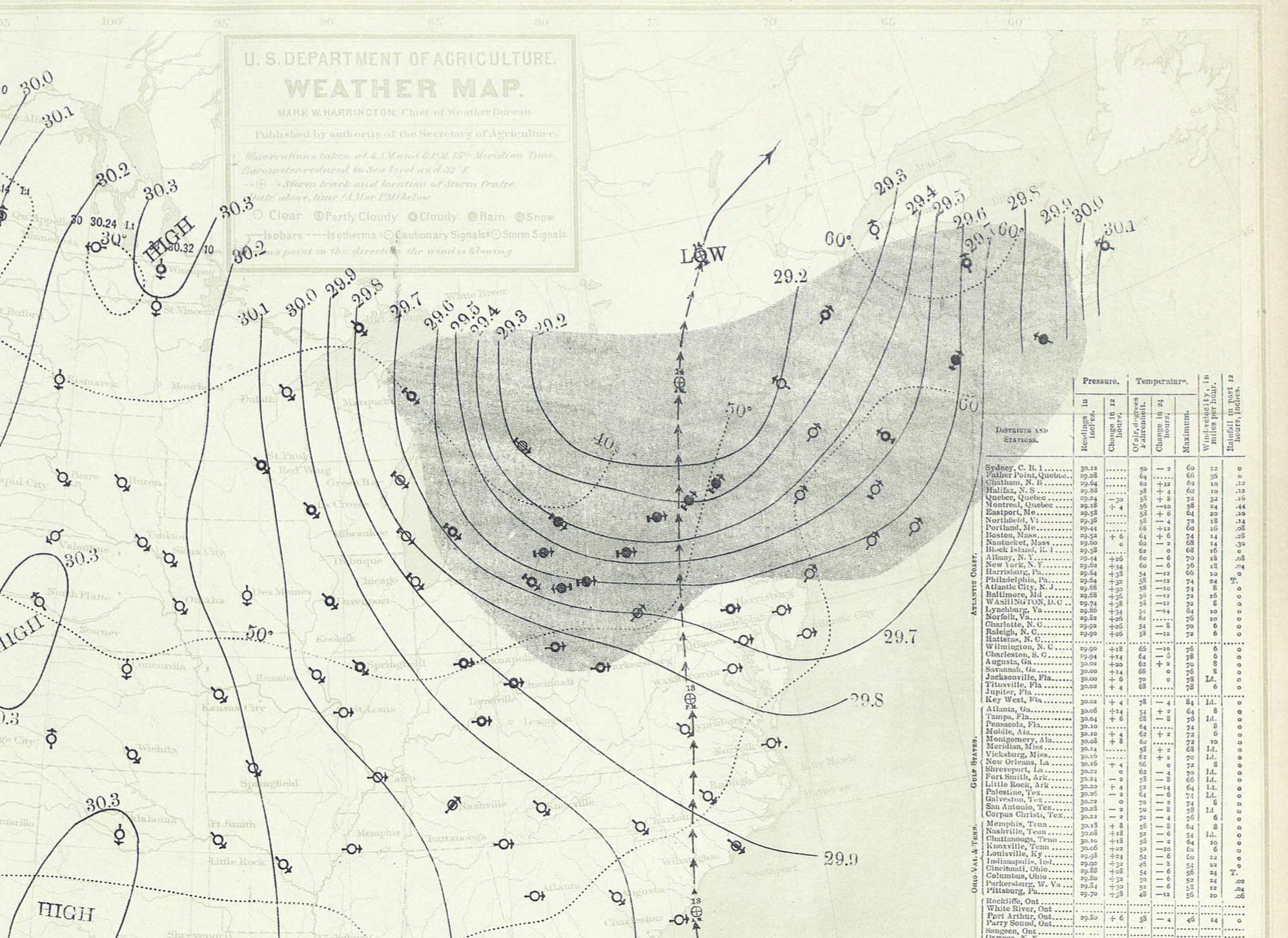
View of the storm as an extratropical cyclone nearing Canada on October 14

In New York, sustained winds reached 47 mph (76 km/h) in New York City, cutting off communications by telegraph and telephone. Stormy conditions left the streets mostly deserted. Waves swept away parts of the beach accessways at Coney Island. The storm downed several trees and fences and destroyed a few homes in Brooklyn. The Monthly Weather Review of October 1893 noted, however, that within the state, the cyclone "did little damage except in the western portion and on the lakes." Ulster and Wayne counties both reported significant losses to fruit crops, including grapes and peaches. In the latter, winds also demolished or deroofed some buildings. The Hudson River rose enough in Ulster County to flood the docks of Rondout. Strong winds in the Great Lakes region prevented many people from standing, downed many lines, unroofed a number of structures, and destroyed four cottages and a railroad depot in Buffalo, causing three deaths. Hundreds of signs and trees were knocked over, while the storm blew around approximately 400,000 to 500,000 ft (120,000 to 150,000 m) of lumber. A large retort house at a gas company completely collapsed, leaving at least $20,000 in damage. The center crossed Lake Ontario, sinking 10 ships and stranding 29 others, leading to the loss of 54 lives and about $700,000 in damage. Another person died after being blown into the Niagara River.

In Connecticut, wind gusts reached 63 mph (101 km/h) in New London. Communications companies reported downed telegraph wires throughout the state. The Waterbury Evening Democrat reported coastal flooding along the shore of Long Island Sound and the beaching of many small boats, "but the wreckage is slight compared with the August storms." Rhode Island's capital city of Providence observed sustained winds of 38 mph (61 km/h). Two scows owned by a dredging company capsized there, but little other damage occurred in the city. Many trees and fences fell on the outskirts of Providence, while many Western Union telegraph poles toppled at Dodgeville. In Massachusetts, heavy crop damage occurred in the vicinity of Amesbury, where the storm also knocked down numerous trees and telegraph and telephone lines. Recorded wind gusts along coastal Massachusetts reached 50 mph (80 km/h), snapping telegraph wires between Martha's Vineyard and Nantucket. In Maine, Portland had "one of the wildest days ever known here" according to The Boston Globe. Extensive damage occurred to schooners in Portland and nearby islands. Bangor experienced interruptions to communications and damage to awnings, trees, and signs.

The extratropical remnants of the hurricane entered Canada on October 14, first crossing the province of Ontario. Wind gusts reached about 60 mph (97 km/h) in Niagara Falls, levelling trees, fences, and telegraph and telephone wires. Toronto observed more than 3 in (76 mm) of rain in a 24-hour period. Telegraph communications experienced significant interruptions. Some vessels capsized, including six yachts at the Royal Canadian Yacht Club, and many others were driven ashore. In Hamilton, several homes flooded and three yachts capsized. About 100 barrels were swept off a dock in the nearby city of Burlington. The barge Hecla went ashore at Wellington for a loss of approximately $75,000. Farther east, the storm downed trees and fences and disrupted shipping somewhat in Kingston.

== See also ==
- List of United States hurricanes
- List of South Carolina hurricanes
- Hurricane Fran
- Hurricane Hazel
- Hurricane Hugo
