= Dunbar Davis =

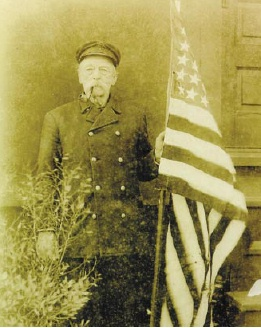
Davis outside the new Oak Island Station in 1892

Dunbar John Davis (June 30, 1843 – March 30, 1923) was a Keeper in the United States Life-Saving Service. He served at the Cape Fear Station and was later transferred to the Oak Island Station in 1892. Davis was known for numerous rescues at sea but is most famous for his rescue during a hurricane in 1893.

== Sea Islands Hurricane ==
In August of 1893, the Sea Islands Hurricane hit the Georgia, South Carolina, and North Carolina coasts. The historic hurricane, by modern standards, would have been a Category 3 with sustained wind speeds of 120 miles per hour (190 km/h). However, the hurricane had an unusually low pressure at 931 mbar making it one of the most powerful storms to ever hit the East Coast of the United States.

Davis, who was the Keeper of the Oak Island Station, set off with his few crewmen. Entering the storm and the dangerous waters of the Graveyard of the Atlantic, he and his crew rescued all crewmembers aboard the four ships: Three Sisters, Kate Giffor, Wustrow, and Enchantress.

== Later life and death ==
After the hurricane, Davis lived on another 30 years. Davis died in 1923. He is buried at the Old Morse Cemetery in Southport. There, a row of granite tombstones marks the births and deaths of most of the Davis family. The tallest tombstone, however, is that of Dunbar Davis.

== In Media ==
Music featuring Dunbar Davis:

- The band Scearce & Ketner made a song about his famous 1893 rescue called "The Long Day of Dunbar Davis".

Numerous books tell of the many rescues Davis had over his career. Notable books that feature stories of Dunbar Davis:

- Bald Head: A History of Smith Island and Cape Fear
- "A Day in the Life of Dunbar Davis" from Graveyard of the Atlantic
