= 1893 Sea Islands hurricane =

Category 3 Atlantic hurricane in 1893

Hurricane Six 1893 Sea Islands hurricane
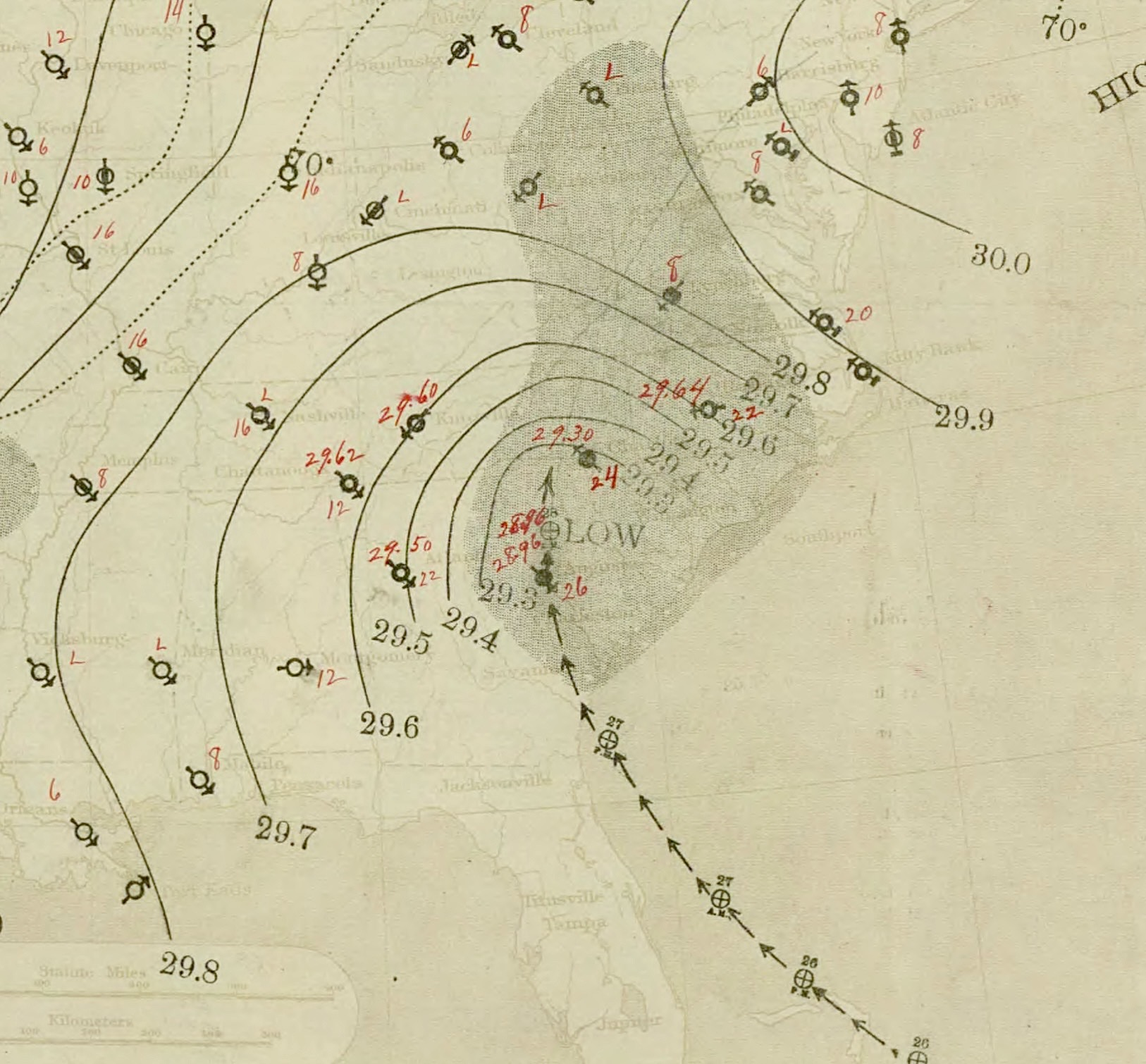
- Surface weather map on August 28, showing the hurricane over the Southeast United States

Meteorological history
- Formed: August 15, 1893
- Dissipated: September 2, 1893

Category 3 major hurricane
- 1-minute sustained (SSHWS/NWS)
- Highest winds: 120 mph (195 km/h)
- Lowest pressure: 954 mbar (hPa); 28.17 inHg

Overall effects
- Fatalities: 1,000–2,000
- Damage: $1 million (1893 USD)
- Areas affected: Georgia, South Carolina
- IBTrACS
- Part of the 1893 Atlantic hurricane season

The 1893 Sea Islands hurricane was a catastrophic and deadly Category 3 major hurricane that struck the Sea Islands near Savannah, Georgia on August 27, 1893. It was the 7th deadliest hurricane in United States history, and was one of three deadly hurricanes during the 1893 Atlantic hurricane season; the storm killed an estimated 1,000–2,000 people, mostly from storm surge that inundated the low-lying areas across the Southeastern United States in Georgia and South Carolina. One long-term consequence of the hurricane was the strengthening of Jim Crow laws that enforced racial segregation in the southern United States.

United States Life-Saving Service Keeper Dunbar Davis became known nationwide for rescuing four ships in the storm.

== Meteorological history ==
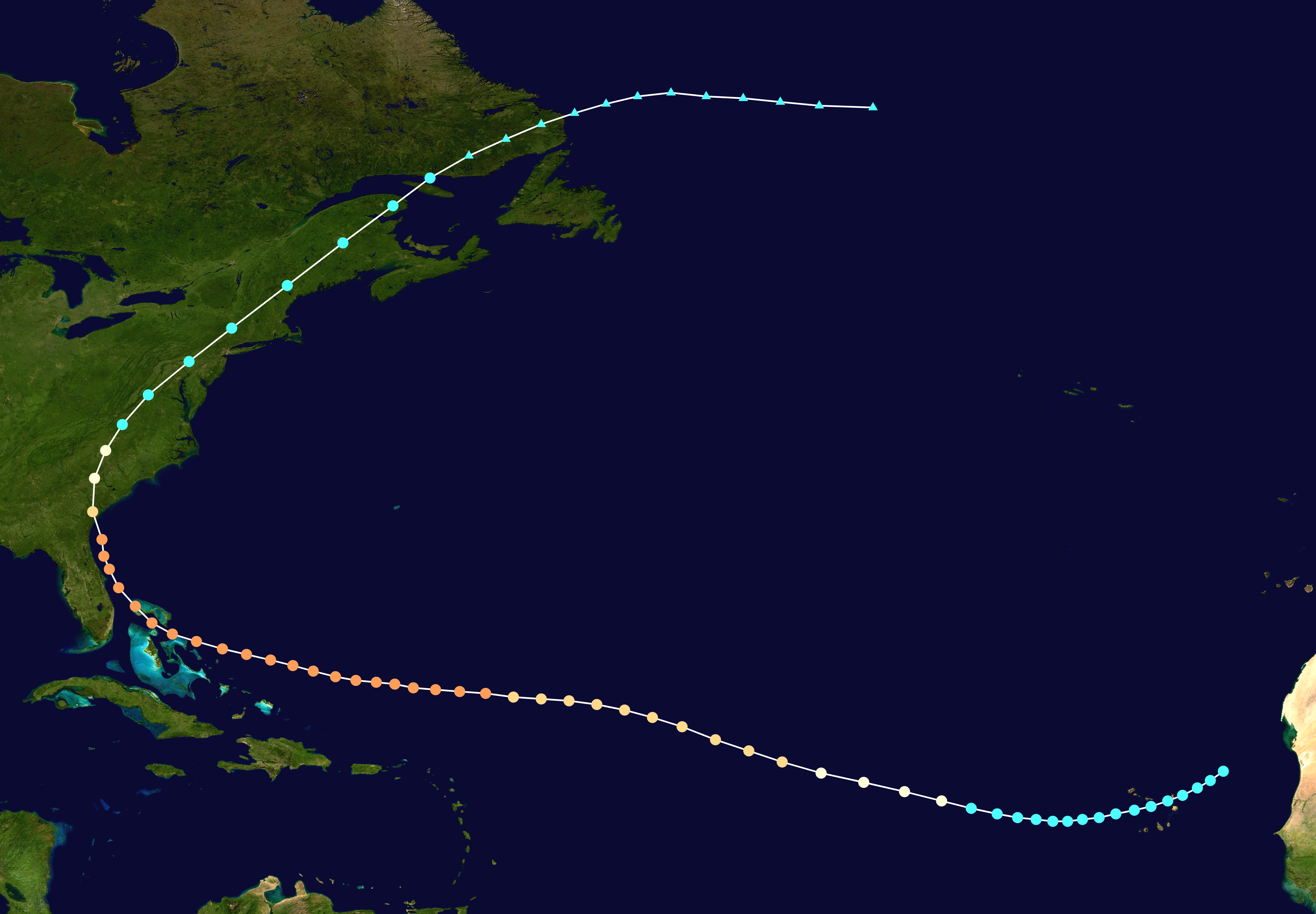
Map plotting the storm's track and intensity, according to the Saffir–Simpson scale Map key Saffir–Simpson scale Tropical depression (≤38 mph, ≤62 km/h) Tropical storm (39–73 mph, 63–118 km/h) Category 1 (74–95 mph, 119–153 km/h) Category 2 (96–110 mph, 154–177 km/h) Category 3 (111–129 mph, 178–208 km/h) Category 4 (130–156 mph, 209–251 km/h) Category 5 (≥157 mph, ≥252 km/h) Unknown Storm type Tropical cyclone Subtropical cyclone Extratropical cyclone, remnant low, tropical disturbance, or monsoon depression

Modern analysis of historical records has allowed the history of this storm to be pieced together, although the analysis is only an estimate since few accurate meteorological records were taken.

On August 15, 1893, a tropical storm formed east of Cape Verde. It likely passed directly through the islands on the 16th, leaving their vicinity during the evening of the 17th. It became a hurricane on the 19th, while crossing the Atlantic between the Cape Verde Islands and the Lesser Antilles. The hurricane continued to strengthen, attaining Category 3 status on August 22 while located northeast of the Lesser Antilles. By the evening of the 25th, the storm was approaching the Bahamas. During the approach it began to deviate from its westerly course and arc west-northwest. It is believed that the first effects of the storm were beginning to be felt in the Sea Islands area, with the winds steadily increasing during the night of the 25th.

Some of the inhabitants anticipated the storm and left the islands as quickly as possible. The conditions rapidly deteriorated on the island and the hurricane passed over sometime on the 26th. By now the hurricane was turning more and more towards the north. It moved parallel to the coast for about one hundred miles before making landfall.

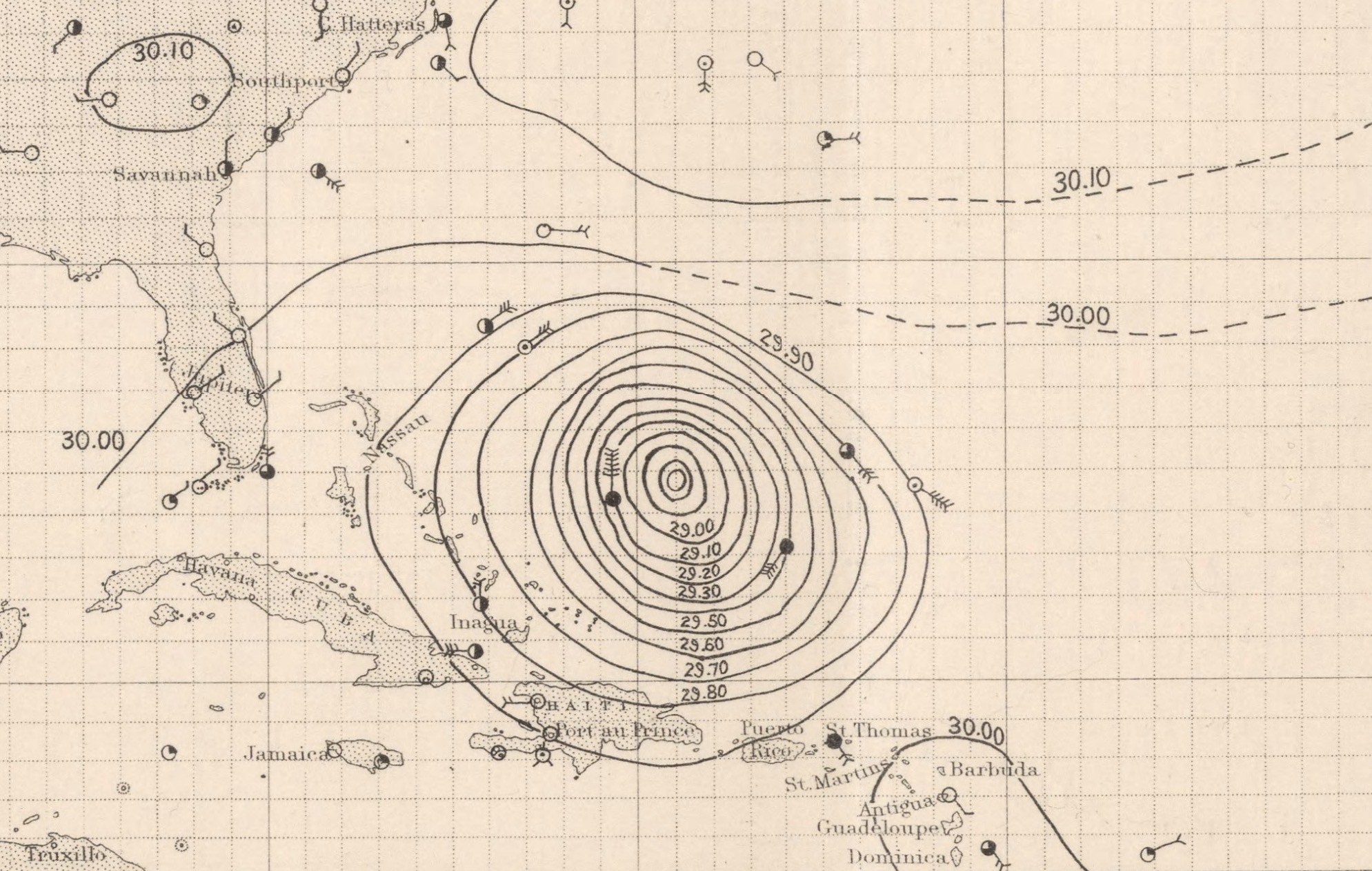
Weather map of the hurricane approaching the Bahamas on August 25

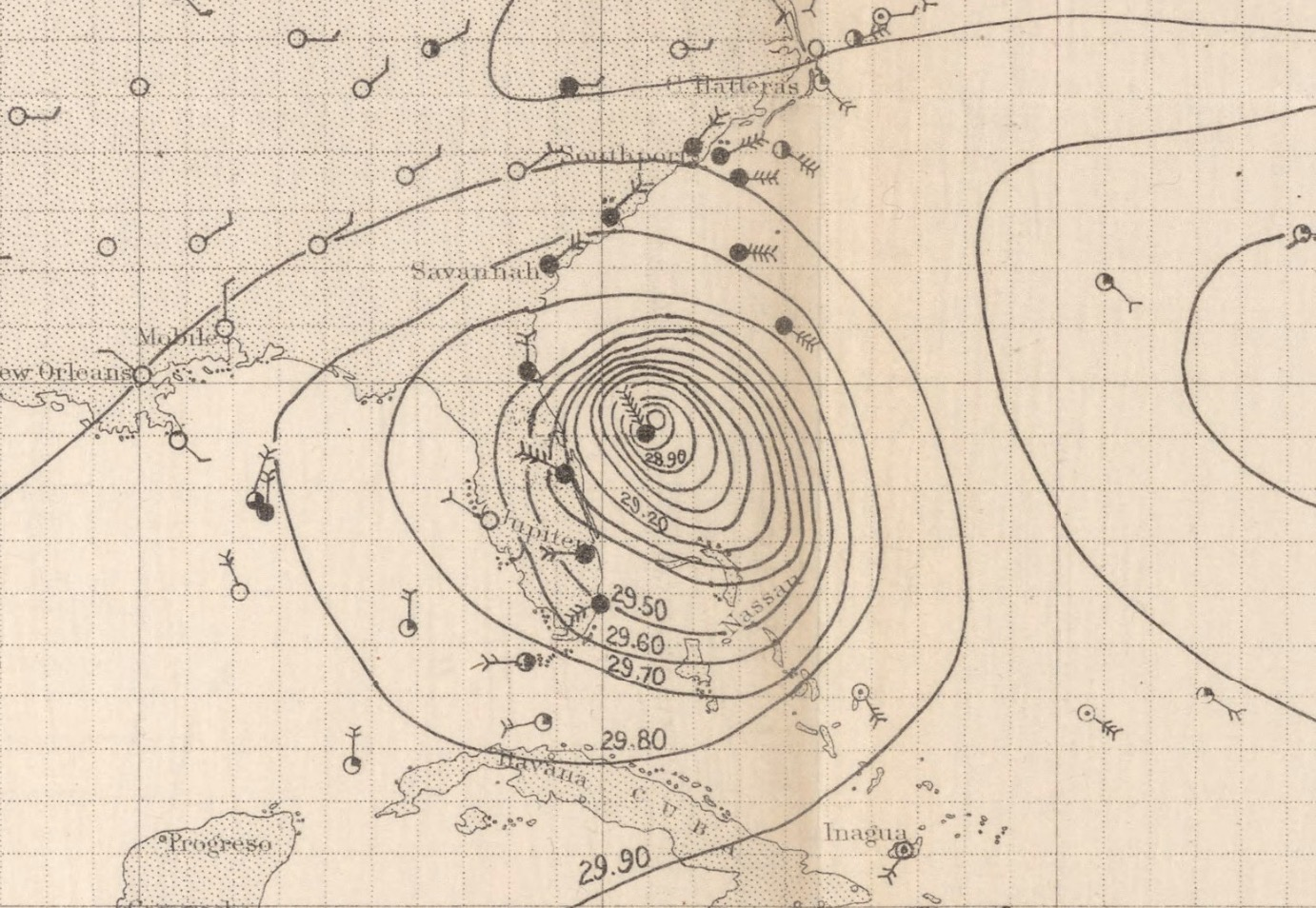
Weather map of the hurricane approaching landfall in Georgia on August 27

Landfall occurred near Savannah, Georgia, on August 27. Reports from the time say that wind during landfall was around 120 mph (190 km/h), making it a category 3 storm. Pressure in Savannah was measured at 960 mbar (28 inHg); modern estimates put the pressure around 954 mbar (28.2 inHg) at landfall, and possibly as low as 931 mbar (27.5 inHg) out at sea. This would have made the hurricane most likely stronger than a Category 3 storm on the Saffir–Simpson Hurricane Scale. The hurricane passed north over South Carolina on August 28 and moved up the U.S. East Coast before becoming extratropical over Atlantic Canada. The storm likely intensified to a Category 4, or 5, but there are no reports of this occurring.

== Impact ==
Deadliest United States hurricanes
Rank	Hurricane	Season	Fatalities
1	4 "Galveston"	1900	8,000–12,000
2	4 "San Ciriaco"	1899	3,400
3	5 Maria	2017	2,982
4	5 "Okeechobee"	1928	2,823
5	4 "Cheniere Caminada"	1893	2,000
6	5 Katrina	2005	1,392
7	3 "Sea Islands"	1893	1,000–2,000
8	3 "Indianola"	1875	771
9	4 "Florida Keys"	1919	745
10	2 "Georgia"	1881	700
Reference: NOAA, GWU (Note: The storm category color indicates the intensity of the hurricane when landfalling in the U.S.)

In the United States, coastal flooding was reported from St. Augustine, Florida, to Georgetown, South Carolina. The storm downed hundreds of trees and partially or fully deroofed dozens of buildings in Florida, some as far as 50 mi (80 km) inland. Storm surge and abnormally high tides also caused damage, especially along the First Coast. Winds deroofed structures as far south as St. Augustine and many buildings in Mayport suffered damage. Nearby Jacksonville reported deroofed structures and downed trees and signs. In Georgia, storm surge and tides inundated coastal areas with up to 7 ft (2.1 m) of water on Hutchinson Island and at least 6 ft (1.8 m) on Tybee Island and in parts of Savannah. All along the coast around Savannah and Tybee Island, tides washed away or destroyed homes, piers, and wharves, and beached ships, while high winds destroyed many other buildings and downed numerous trees. Wind damage was reported as far inland as Augusta, Midville, and Waycross.

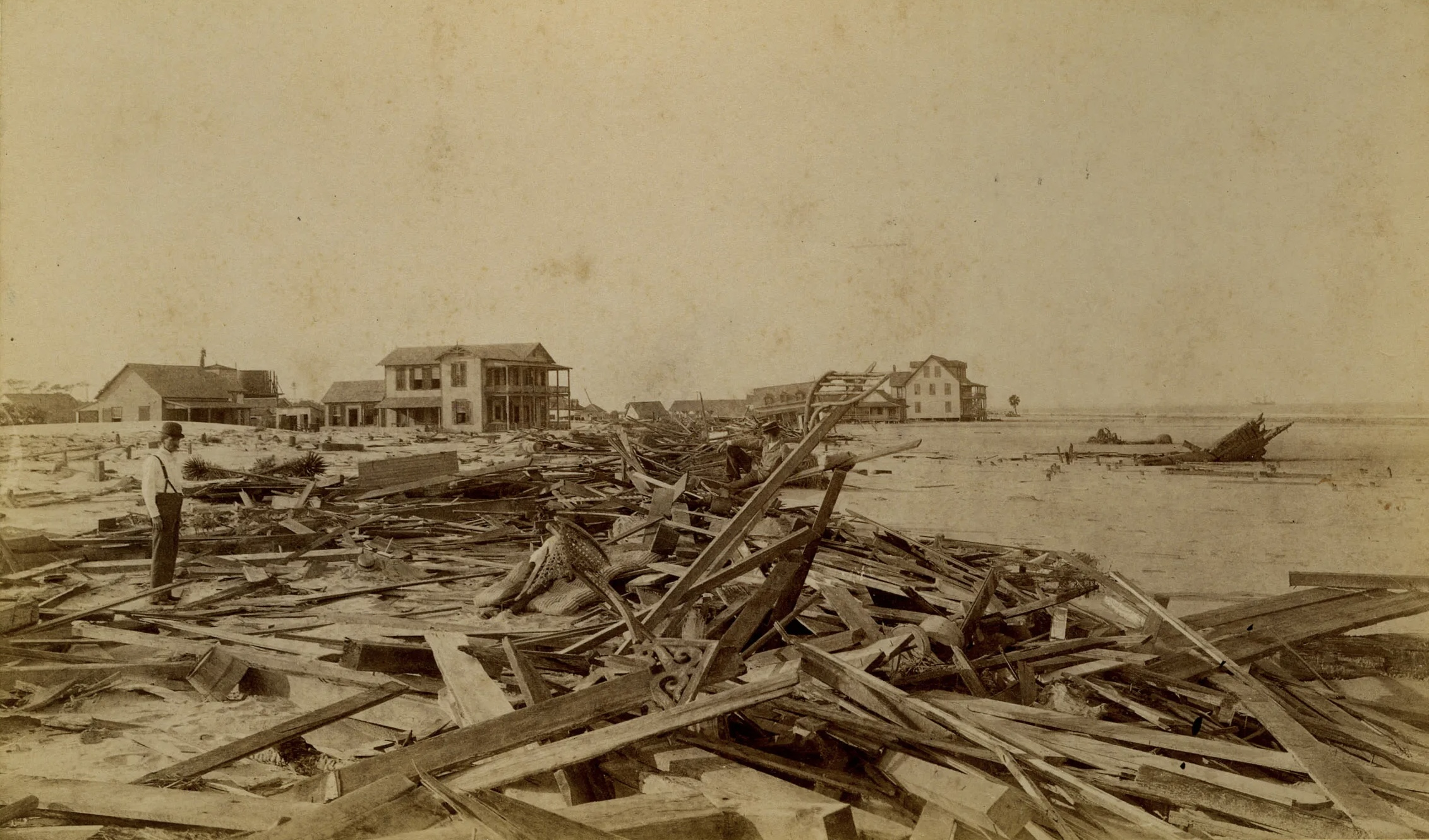
Destruction in Tybee Island after the hurricane

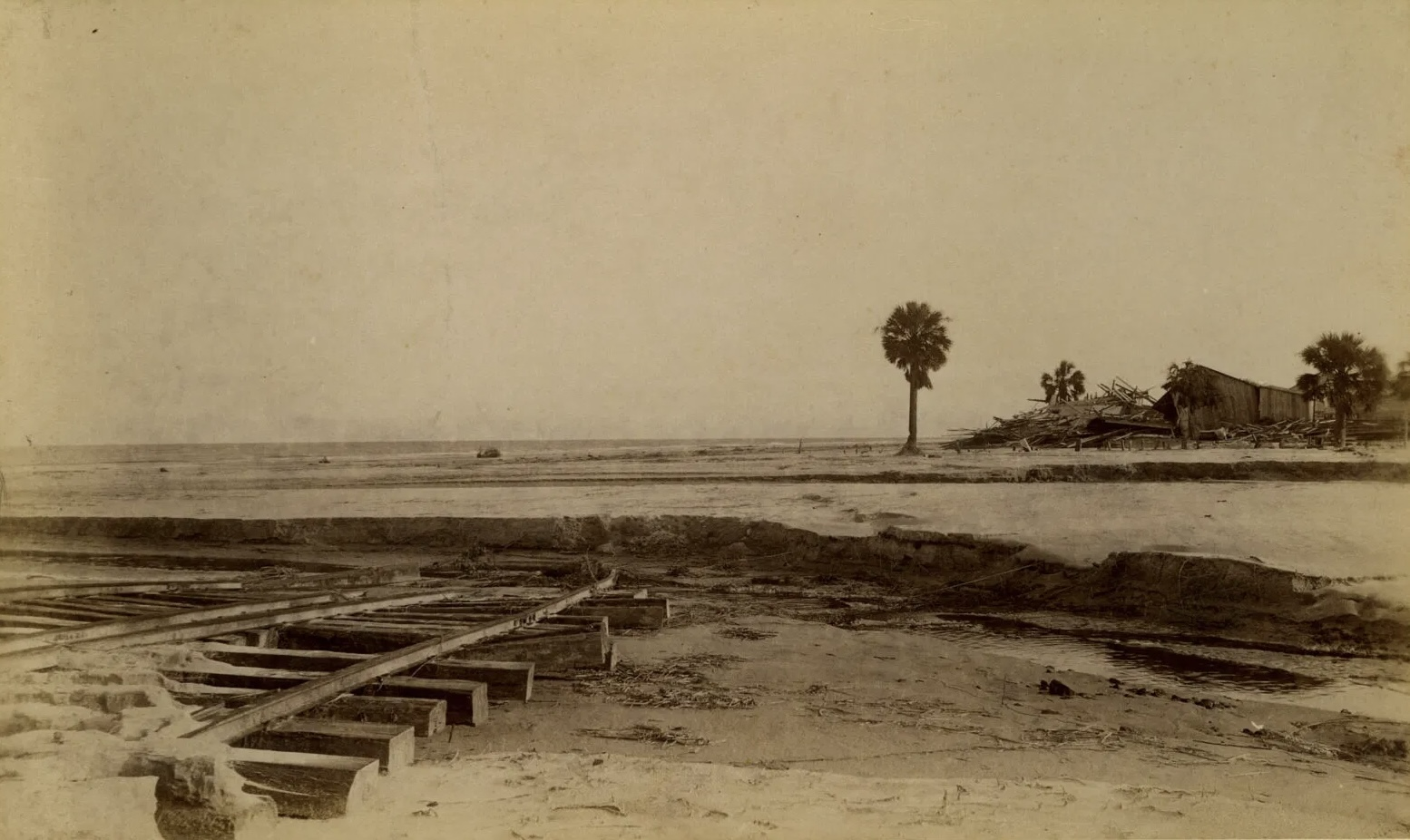
Damaged railroad tracks and homes on the beach in Tybee Island

The hurricane carried with it a heavy storm surge, reaching 16 ft (4.9 m) above sea-level according to Clara Barton, although the modern NOAA SLOSH model calculates that some areas may have been inundated up to 30 ft (9.1 m), causing great destruction along the coastline and offshore Sea Islands in Georgia and South Carolina. The News and Courier reported that storm surge reached 18 ft (5.5 m) at Wappoo Cut on Edisto Island and also noted that the water "spread itself over the surrounding country like an endless inland lake. For two days communication between the island and the mainland was practically suspended". Intense winds destroyed many homes, outbuildings, and trees on the island. Waters from Port Royal Sound submerged Coosaw, Lady's, Parris, Warsaw, and Port Royal islands, including the city of Beaufort. There, coastal flooding significantly damaged or demolished waterfronts and wharves, while few homes in Beaufort and Port Royal remained undamaged by the winds.

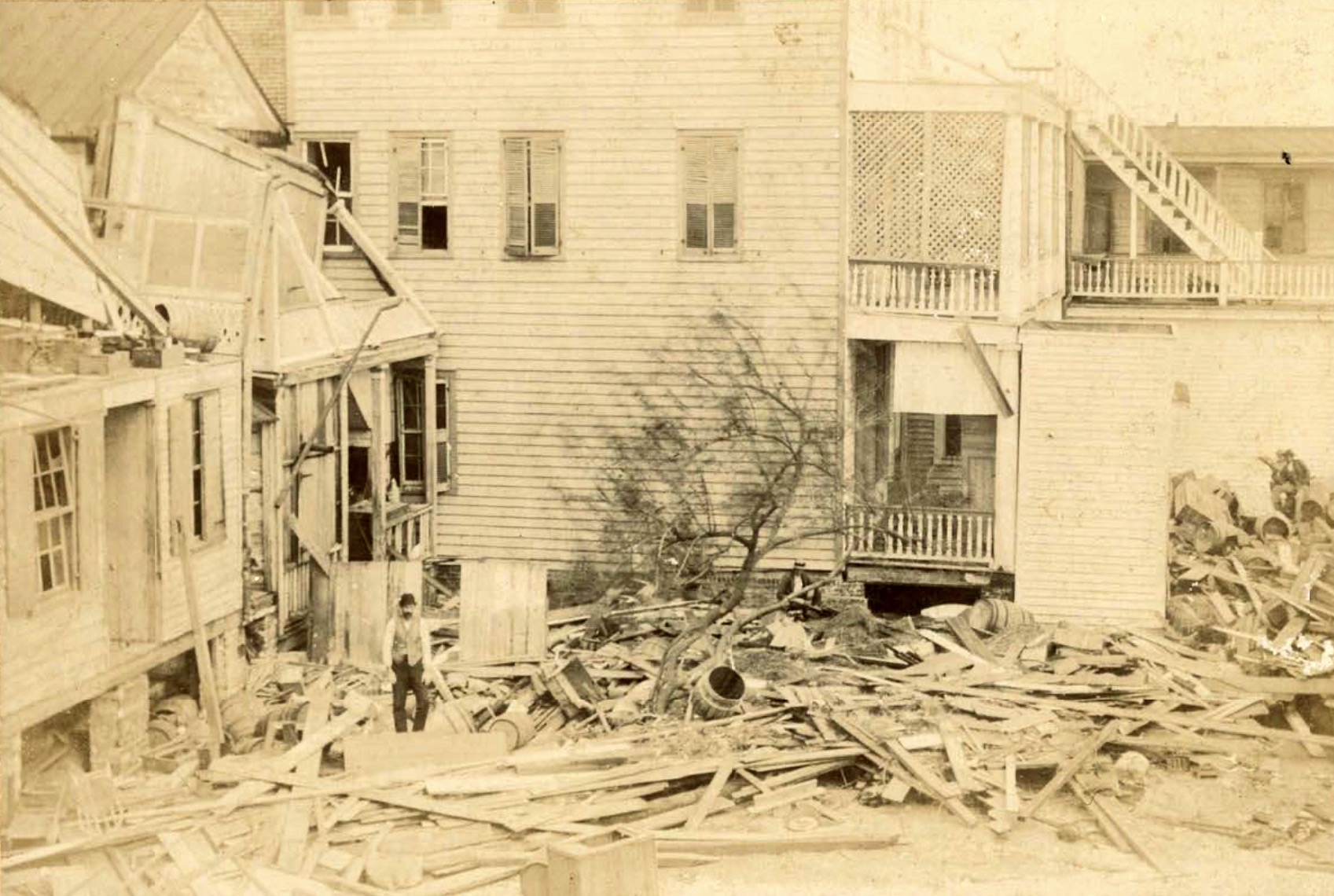
Damaged houses in Beaufort, South Carolina after the hurricane

In Charleston, storm surge and tides flooded The Battery and some western parts of the city. Winds downed trees and unroofed some homes. An estimated 1,000 to 2,000 people were killed (mostly by drowning), putting it on-par with 2005's Hurricane Katrina as the sixth-deadliest hurricane in US history. St. Helena was estimated to have 6,000 African-Americans living there while 2,000 were women. The majority of the African-Americans owned land there and some rented. A lot of structures in that area were not elevated higher than 2 feet, and consequently were inundated by the first waves that went above the normal high water mark.

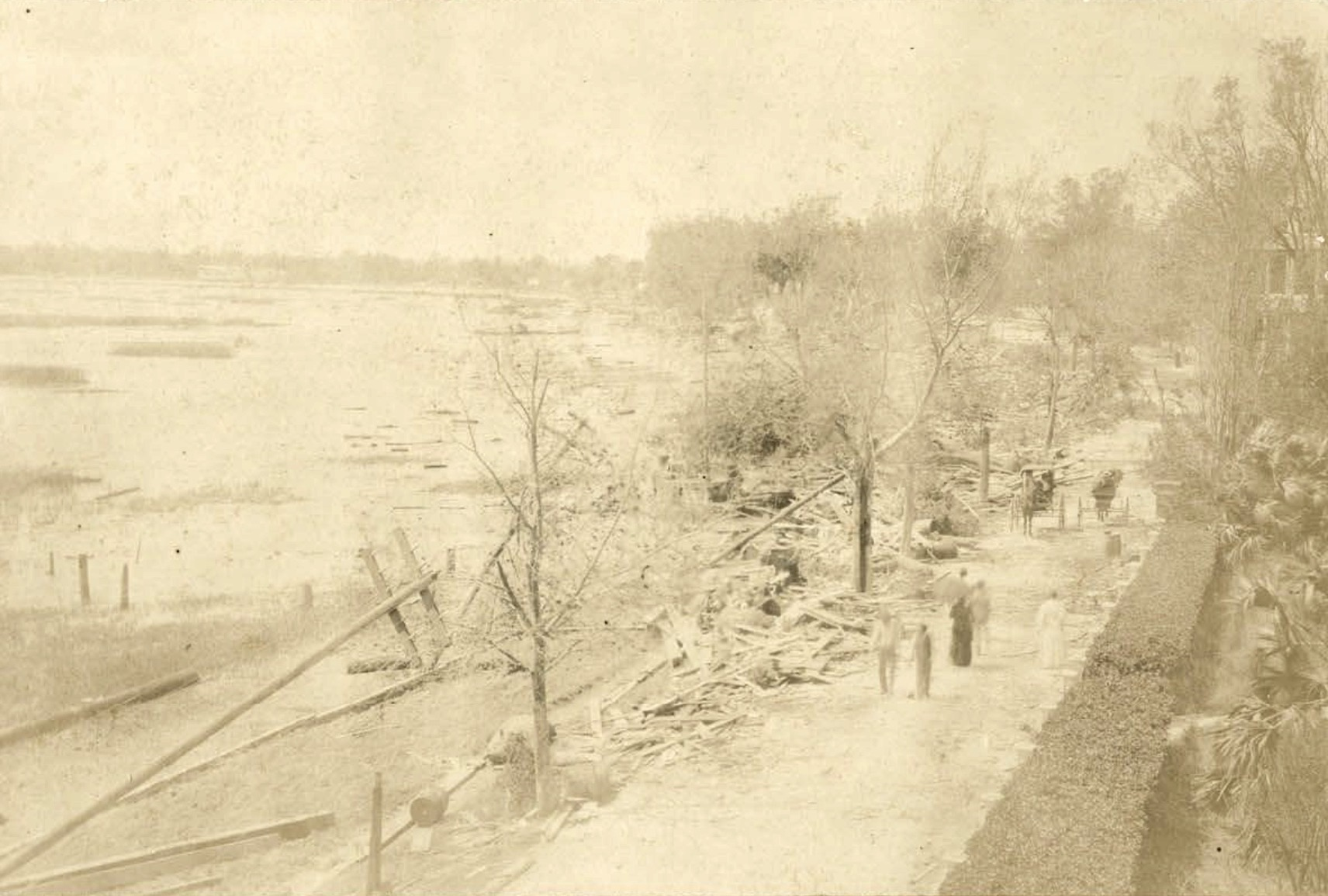
Damage at Bay Street in Beaufort, South Carolina after the hurricane

Although the hurricane was devastating, the American Red Cross did not arrive until October 1, possibly because of ongoing efforts following another hurricane that hit South Carolina in June. After the Red Cross arrived, a warehouse of clothing and food was started at Beaufort, South Carolina, to provide services to the affected. Relief efforts were impeded by a second Category 3 hurricane that struck just north of the area, near Charleston, on October 13. During a massive 10-month relief campaign, success was declared, with the Sea Islands population living in decent houses producing their own food again. Damages from the storm totaled to at least $1 million (1893 USD), equivalent to $36 million in 2025.

Path and Storm Surge of the 1893 Sea Islands Hurricane

The predominantly Black population of the Sea Islands suffered disproportionate material losses from the storm compared to the mainland. Although local and Red Cross support efforts were integrated, relief efforts that benefited the Sea Islanders became politicized over fears that outside aid would bring with it a loss of state control similar to what South Carolina experienced under Reconstruction. Politicians and newspapers highlighted the plight of white farmers and communities, pushing the Red Cross to redirect supplies from Black Sea Islands communities. Throughout the recovery, South Carolina Democrats in control of the state government worked to undermine the ability of Black Sea Islanders to reestablish financial security and stability.

Damage was reported as far north as Maine. Some areas, particularly New York City and Long Island, were already reeling from what later came to be known as the 1893 New York hurricane that had struck the region just days before, on August 24, and were damaged anew by this storm. "Immense" damage was reported to shade trees and telegraph and telephone wires in Washington, DC. In Annapolis, Maryland, "hardly a tree was left standing" and Baltimore reported the worst flooding since 1868. In New Jersey, damage was "heavy" in the New Brunswick area, and many trees were downed and roofs were blown off in Trenton. Damage was heavy all along the New Jersey coast and breakers were described as the biggest ever witnessed. Railroad tracks were under four feet of water between Bay Head and Berkley. In New York, several people died in the Rockaways, and a number of people were killed at points along the Hudson River when tow boats were destroyed. Crops were heavily damaged in Pennsylvania and upstate New York. Boats were wrecked and sunk in the Dunkirk area. In Brooklyn, where 13 houses under construction were destroyed, damage was "severe" and Gravesend Bay was "littered with the wrecks of small yachts and boats." In Coney Island, roofs were lifted off big buildings and carried for blocks. Waves topped the seawall by 15 feet at Battery Park. Damage was heavy at resorts on Long Island and it was the worst storm on the New England coast in 20 years.

== See also ==
- 1893 Cheniere Caminada hurricane
- 1893 Great Charleston hurricane
- Hurricane Matthew
- Lists of Atlantic hurricanes
  - List of Florida hurricanes
  - List of Georgia hurricanes
  - List of New England hurricanes
  - List of North Carolina hurricanes
  - List of South Carolina hurricanes
