= 1897 Atlantic hurricane season =

- Season summary map

Seasonal boundaries
- First system formed: August 31, 1897
- Last system dissipated: October 29, 1897

Strongest storm
- Name: "One"
  - Maximum winds: 100 mph (155 km/h) (1-minute sustained)
  - Lowest pressure: 972 mbar (hPa; 28.7 inHg)

Seasonal statistics
- Total depressions: 6
- Total storms: 6
- Hurricanes: 3
- Major hurricanes (Cat. 3+): 0
- Total fatalities: 262
- Total damage: At least $150,000 (1897 USD)

Related article
- 1890s North Indian Ocean cyclone seasons

The 1897 Atlantic hurricane season was an inactive season, featuring only six known tropical cyclones, four of which made landfall. There were three hurricanes, none of which strengthened into major hurricanes, which are Category 3 or higher on the modern-day Saffir–Simpson hurricane wind scale. The first system was initially observed south of Cape Verde on August 31, an unusually late date. The storm was the strongest of the season, peaking as a Category 2 hurricane with winds of 100 mph (155 km/h). While located well north of the Azores, rough seas by the storm sunk a ship, killing all 45 crewmen. A second storm was first spotted in the Straits of Florida on September 10. It strengthened into a hurricane and tracked northwestward across the Gulf of Mexico, striking Louisiana shortly before dissipating on September 13. This storm caused 29 deaths and $150,000 (1897 USD) in damage.

The third storm developed in the southeastern Gulf of Mexico on September 20. It tracked along the East Coast of the United States, causing widespread damage, particularly in Florida. A fourth storm was first observed in the northwestern Caribbean Sea on September 25. This storm moved in a semicircular path around Cuba and was last noted offshore Florida four days later. Minor wind and flood damage was reported in Cuba. On October 9, the fifth hurricane of the season was located near the Windward Islands. Moving westward, the storm eventually curved northeastward while crossing the Caribbean Sea, causing it to strike Cuba. Minor damage was reported on the island, though a ship sank with 230 people aboard; 42 of them were rescued, while the remaining 188 were presumed dead. The final observed system developed in the vicinity of the Bahamas on October 23. It later struck the Outer Banks of North Carolina; the storm caused severe flooding in southeastern Virginia, with six deaths reported. It was last noted on October 29.

== Systems ==
=== Hurricane One ===
- Category 2 hurricane (SSHWS)
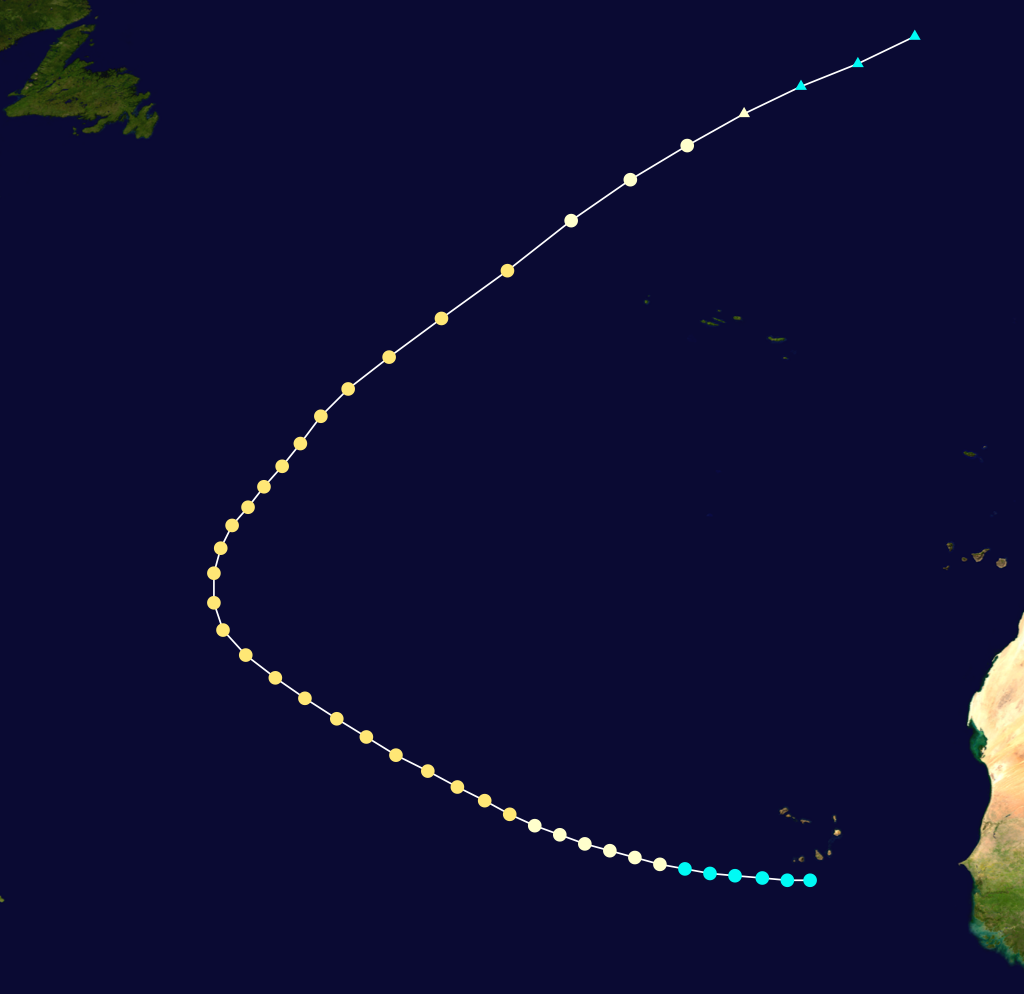
- Duration: August 31 – September 9
- Peak intensity: 100 mph (155 km/h) (1-min); ≤972 mbar (hPa)

The first hurricane of the season was observed near Cape Verde, beginning at 0600 UTC on August 31. Initially a tropical storm, it slowly strengthened while heading west-northwestward, reaching hurricane status on September 1. Curving northwestward, the storm intensified further into a Category 2 hurricane on September 3. It continued heading northwestward until curving to the northeast late on September 6. Around 1130 UTC on the following day, the storm attained its peak intensity with maximum sustained winds of 100 mph (155 km/h) and a minimum barometric pressure of 972 mbar (28.7 inHg). Early on September 9, the system weakened to a Category 1, before transitioning into an extratropical cyclone well north of the Azores later that day. The extratropical remnants continued weaken, before dissipating west of Ireland on September 10. The crew of the barkentine St. Peter reported that another ship capsized with 45 men aboard; all of them drowned.

=== Hurricane Two ===
- Category 1 hurricane (SSHWS)
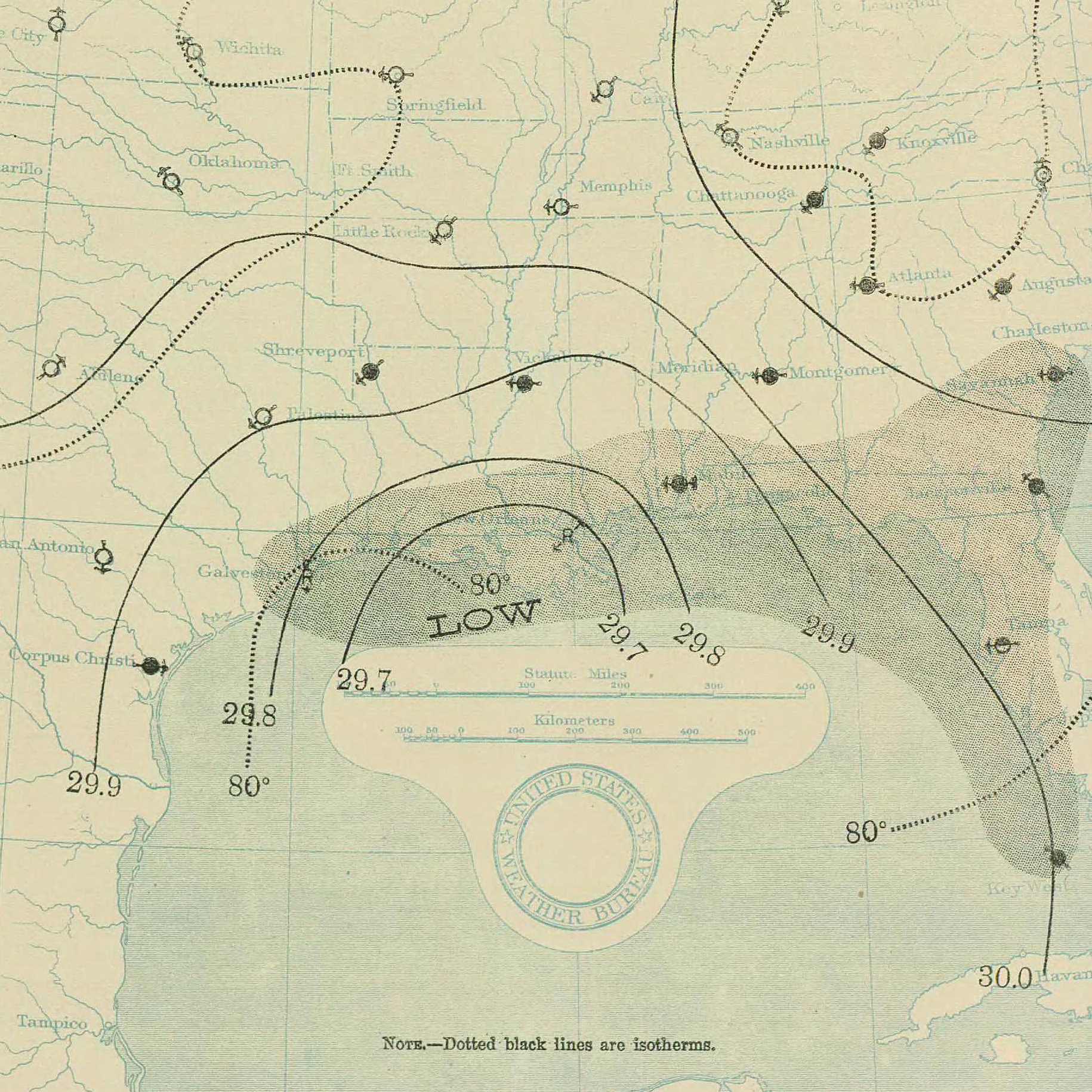
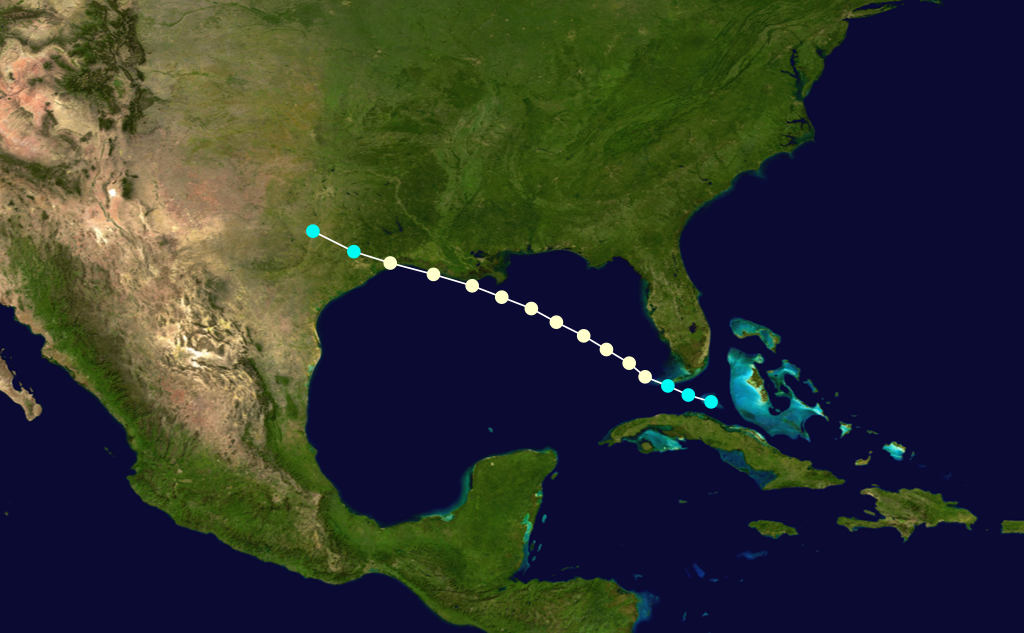
- Duration: September 10 – September 13
- Peak intensity: 85 mph (140 km/h) (1-min); 981 mbar (hPa)

A second hurricane was spotted in the Straits of Florida at tropical storm intensity on September 10. Several hours later, the system made landfall in Marquesas Keys, Florida. Early on September 11, it strengthened into a hurricane. Intensifying slightly further, the storm peaked with maximum sustained winds of 85 mph (140 km/h) shortly thereafter. The hurricane maintained this intensity while moving west-northwestward across the Gulf of Mexico and struck extreme southwestern Cameron Parish, Louisiana early on September 13. Shortly thereafter, it weakened to a tropical storm over Texas, before dissipating several hours later.

No impact was reported in the Florida Keys. Strong winds in southwestern Louisiana damaged crops and toppled windmills. Offshore, boats and schooners suffered severe damage from wind-driven waves. Severe damage occurred in eastern Texas, with strong winds and storm surge damaging or destroying numerous buildings, houses, and crops in several cities, including Beaumont, New Sabine Pass, Orange, Sabine Pass, and Port Arthur. The storm was considered the worst in Orange since 1875. Overall, the storm caused at least 29 fatalities in Texas, with six died at Port Arthur, three offshore, four in Sabine Pass, and sixteen others at Beaumont. Damage in the state reached approximately $150,000.

=== Tropical Storm Three ===
- Tropical storm (SSHWS)
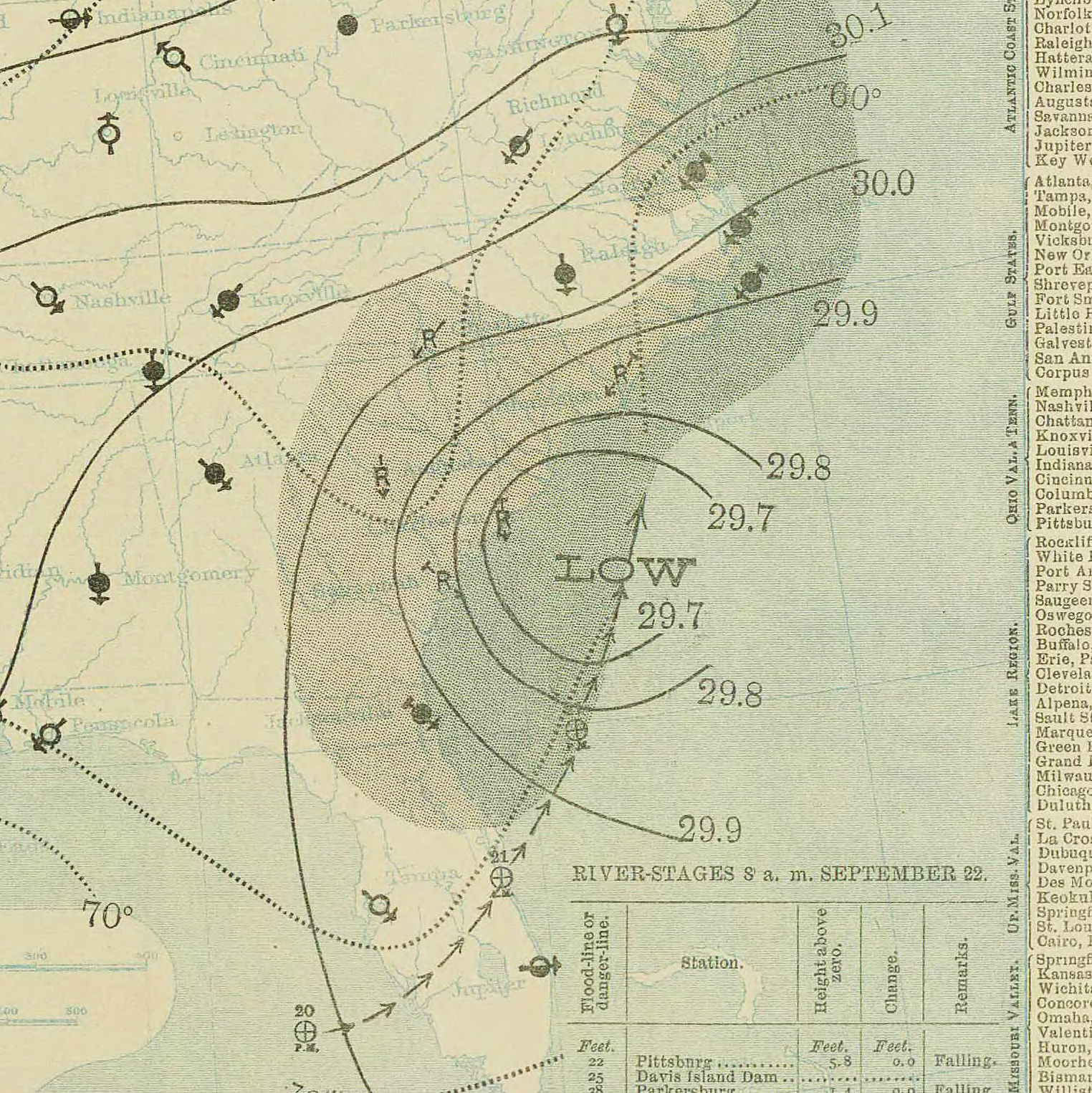
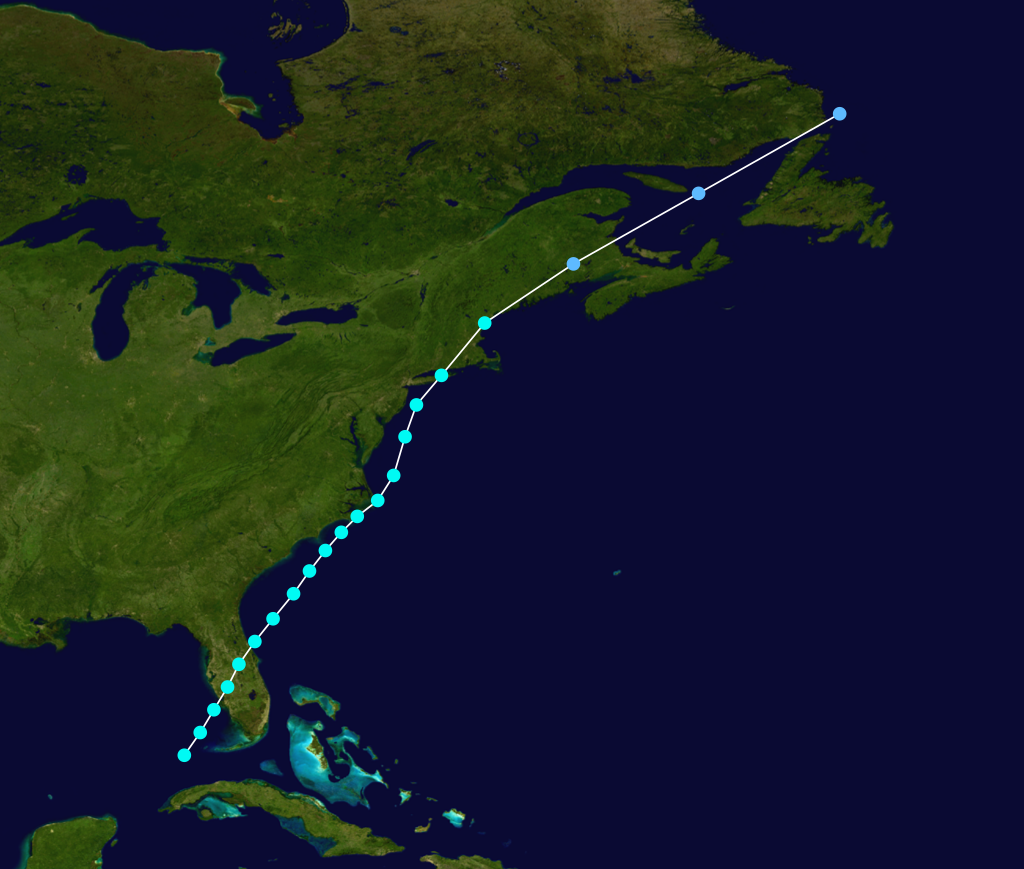
- Duration: September 20 – September 25
- Peak intensity: 70 mph (110 km/h) (1-min); ≤1003 mbar (hPa)

The third storm of the season was first observed in the southeastern Gulf of Mexico on September 20. Strengthening while heading northeastward, the system made landfall near Boca Grande, Florida with winds of 70 mph (110 km/h) early on the following day. Heavy rainfall in Tampa caused the streets and sideways to become inundated, leaving portions of the city impassable, especially areas adjacent to the DeSoto Hotel. Two fire stations were severely damaged. On the east coast of Florida, the worst impact occurred in Cocoa, where some buildings were destroyed and others were deroofed. Further north in Fernandina Beach, ships in the harbor broke loose and tossed about, leaving considerable damage.

Although the storm weakened while crossing Florida, it later re-strengthened after emerging into the Atlantic Ocean later on September 21. The system moved northeastward and made landfall near Hatteras, North Carolina at 1000 UTC on September 23, with winds of 70 mph (110 km/h). In eastern North Carolina, strong winds and high tides were observed in New Bern. Shortly thereafter, it re-emerged into the Atlantic Ocean. The system began weakening, while making two landfalls on September 24, the first on Long Island, New York, and the second near New London, Connecticut. Thereafter, the storm accelerated to the northeast and weakened to a tropical depression over New Brunswick early on September 25. Several hours later, the system dissipated offshore southeastern Labrador.

=== Tropical Storm Four ===
- Tropical storm (SSHWS)
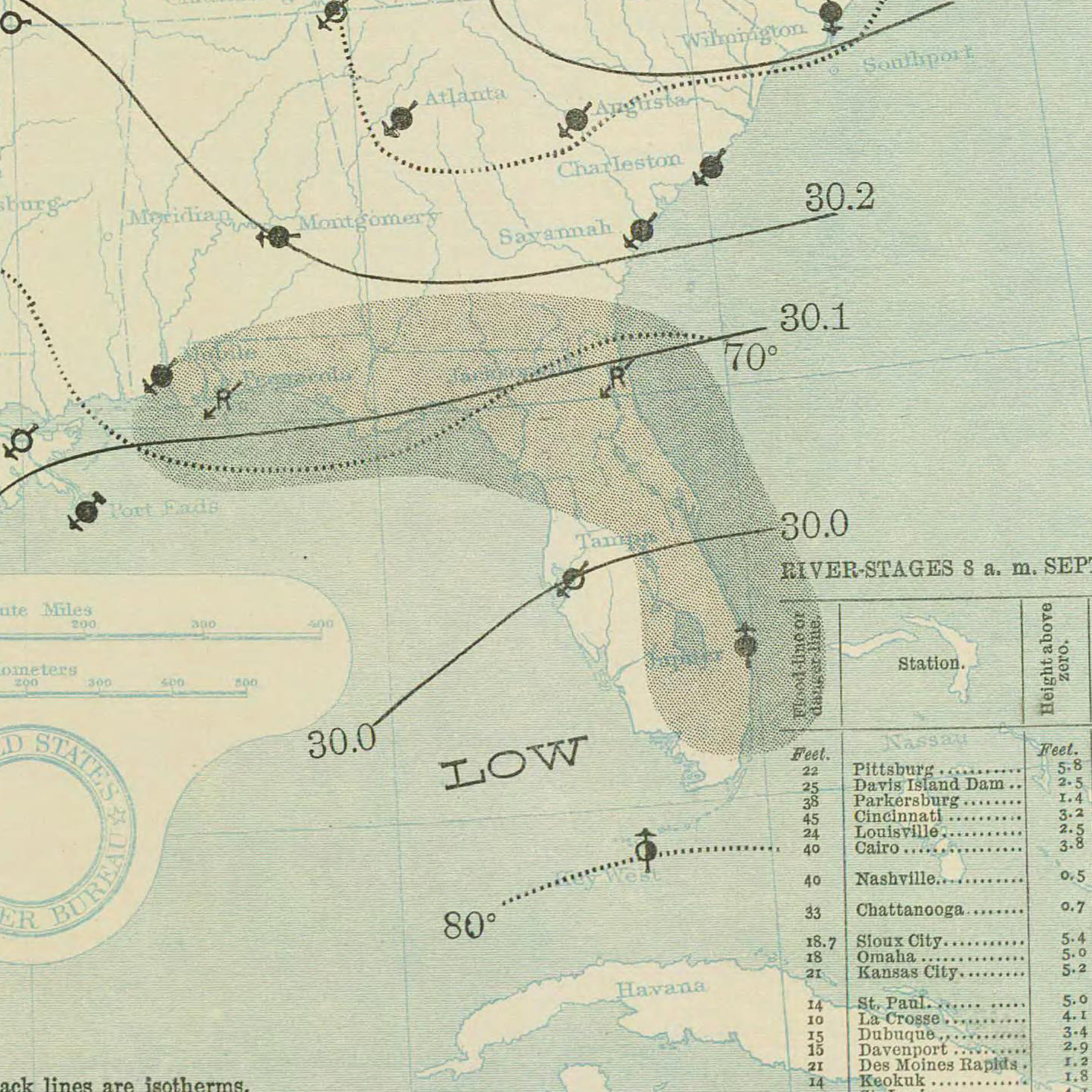
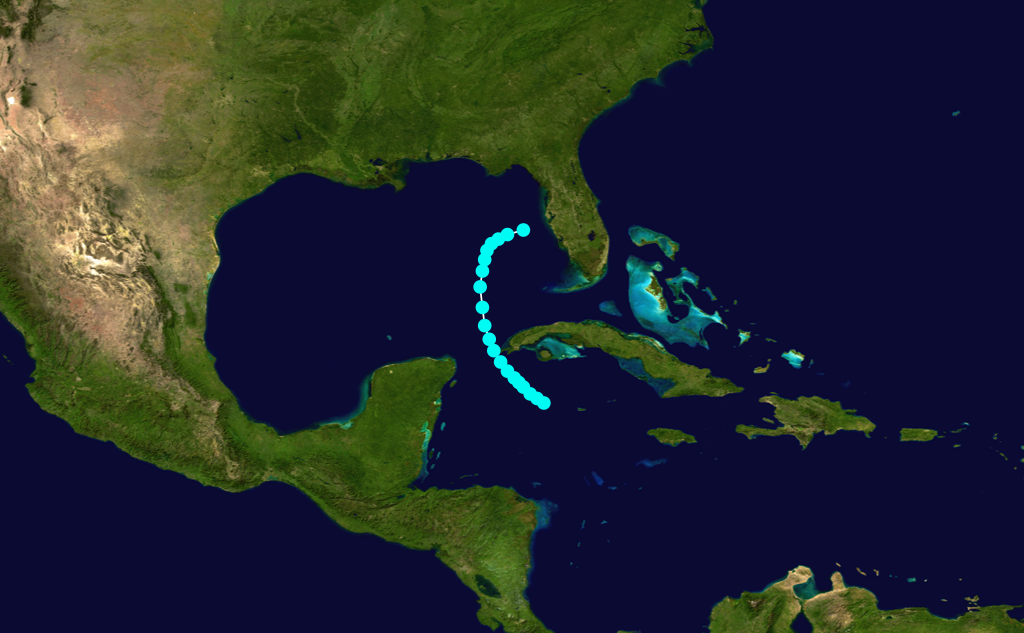
- Duration: September 25 – September 29
- Peak intensity: 45 mph (75 km/h) (1-min); ≤1010 mbar (hPa)

Early on September 25, a tropical storm was spotted about 100 miles (160 km) west of Grand Cayman. It moved slowly northwestward and passed near Cape San Antonio, Cuba early on September 27. The storm then entered the Gulf of Mexico and began strengthening while curving northward. On September 28, the system attained its peak intensity with maximum sustained winds of 45 mph (75 km/h) and a minimum barometric pressure of 1,010 mbar (30 inHg). Early on September 29, the storm curved eastward and dissipated several hours later offshore Florida. In Cuba, the storm brought strong winds and heavy rainfall as far east as Havana, causing flooding, "but no great damage". Climate researcher Michael Chenoweth suggested the exclusion of this cyclone from HURDAT, noting that the report of gale-force winds was more likely due to a cold front.

=== Hurricane Five ===
- Category 1 hurricane (SSHWS)
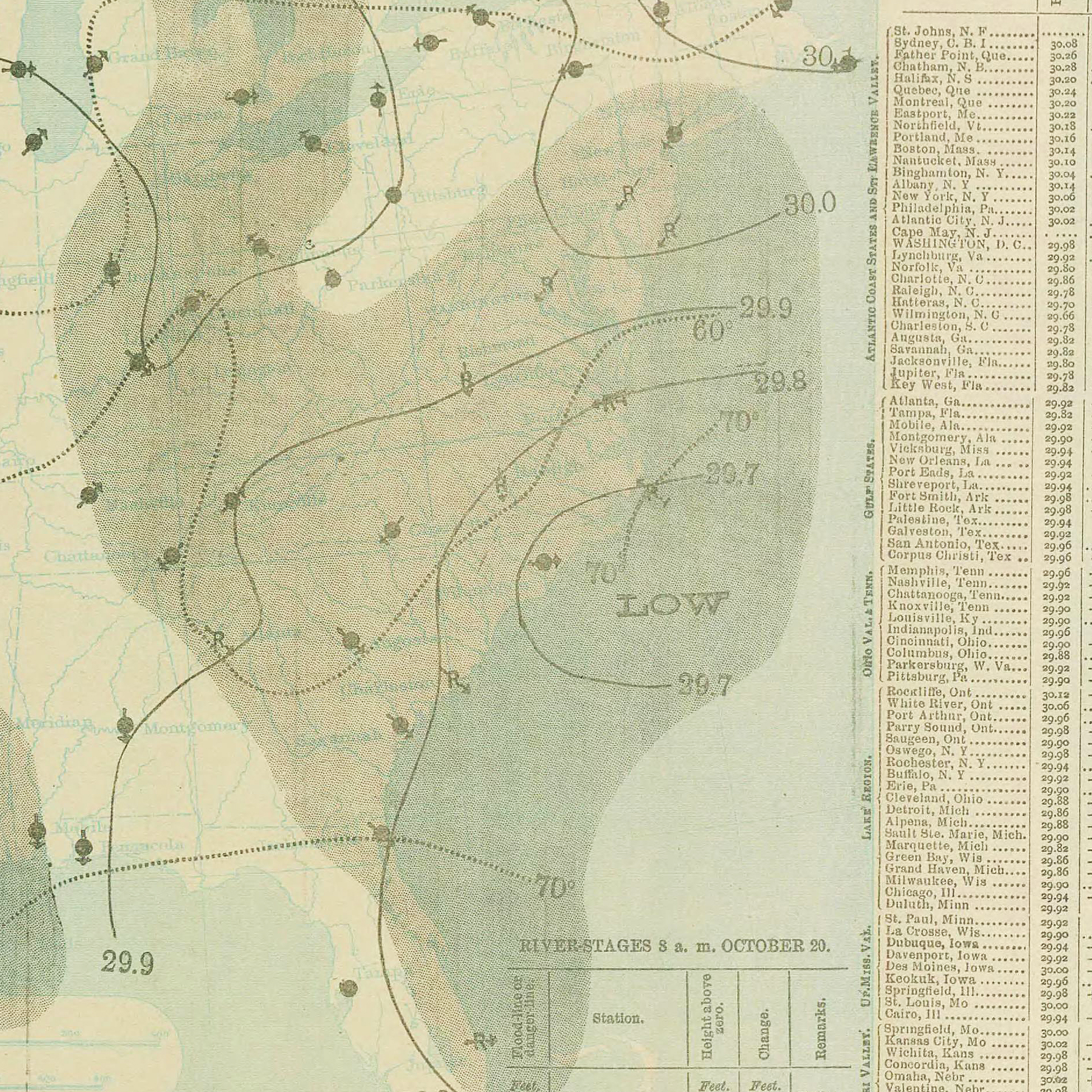
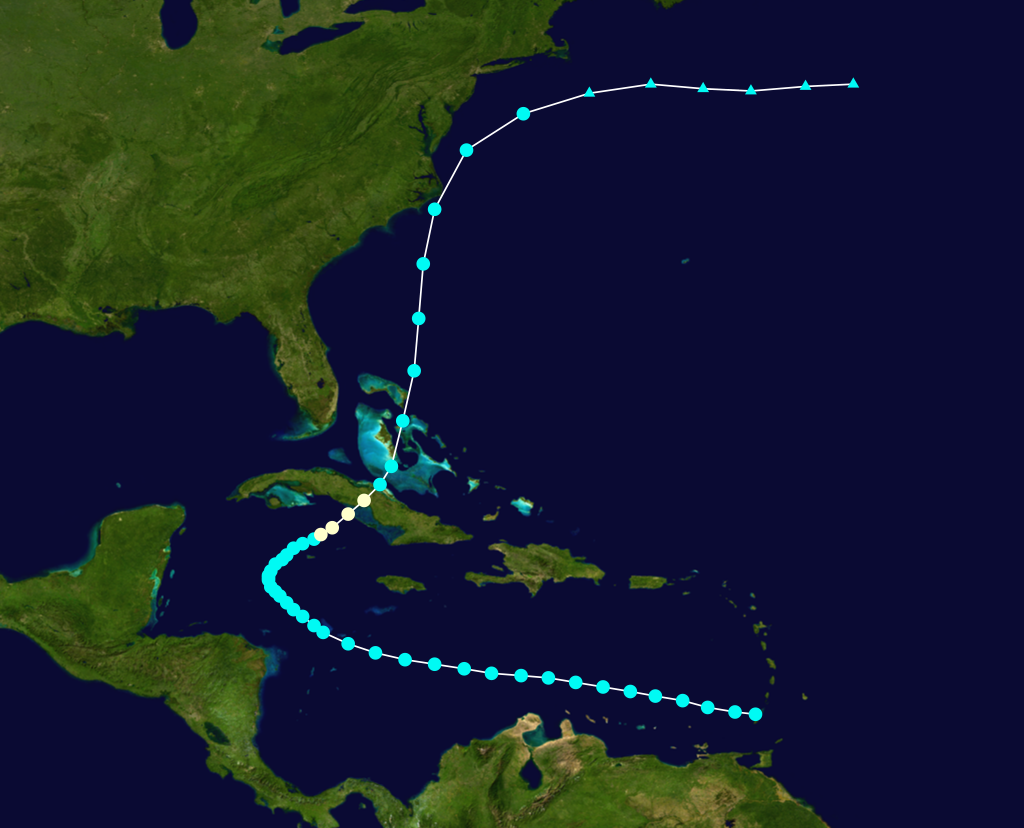
- Duration: October 9 – October 21
- Peak intensity: 80 mph (130 km/h) (1-min); ≤993 mbar (hPa)

The fifth tropical cyclone of the season was first observed near the Windward Islands on October 9. It moved west-northwestward across the Caribbean Sea and remained at that intensity for several days. The storm curved in a northwesterly direction by October 14 while located over the northwestern Caribbean Sea, and then northeastward on the following day. Eventually, it began to strengthen and reached hurricane intensity early on October 18. Several hours later, the hurricane made landfall in modern-day Sancti Spíritus Province, Cuba with winds of 80 mph (130 km/h). Minimal damage was reported in Cuba. However, the ship Triton sank offshore Pinar del Río Province with 230 men aboard. Forty-two people were rescued by passing ships, while the remaining 188 died, including the captain, who committed suicide.

The system weakened while crossing Cuba and fell to tropical storm intensity early on October 19. Around that time, the storm emerged into the Atlantic Ocean near the central Bahamas. Crossing through the islands, the system curved north-northeastward and began to accelerate. It did not re-strengthen and made landfall near Cape Hatteras, North Carolina with winds of 65 mph (100 km/h). Strong winds and rainfall totals ranging from 1 to 7 inches (25 to 178 mm) were observed along the coast of North Carolina. Strong winds were reported in portions of the Northeastern United States, with highest wind speed being 56 mph (90 km/h), observed in Block Island, Rhode Island. Reemerging into the Atlantic Ocean, this system continued rapidly northeastward, before becoming extratropical offshore New England on October 21.

=== Tropical Storm Six ===
- Tropical storm (SSHWS)
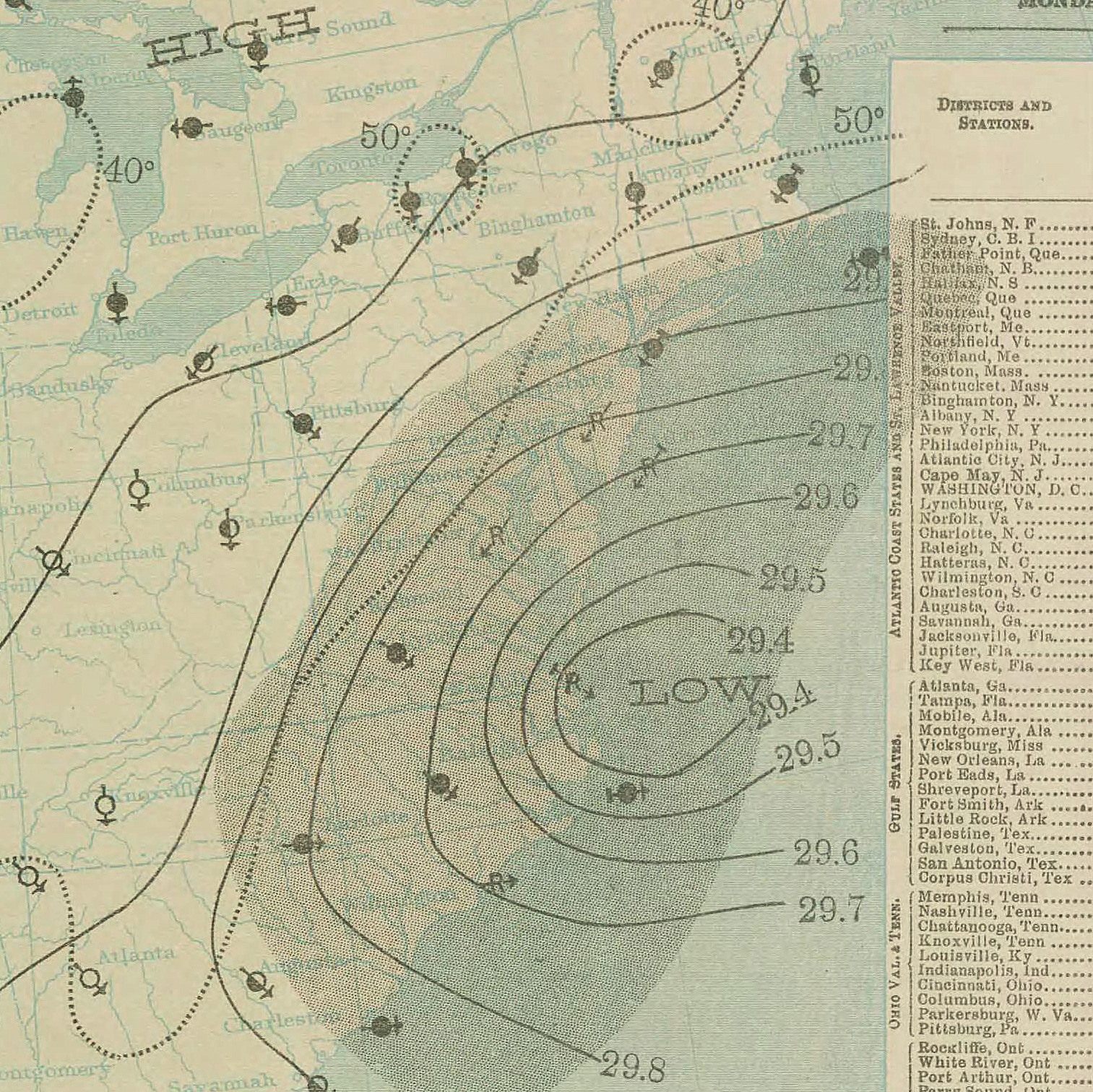
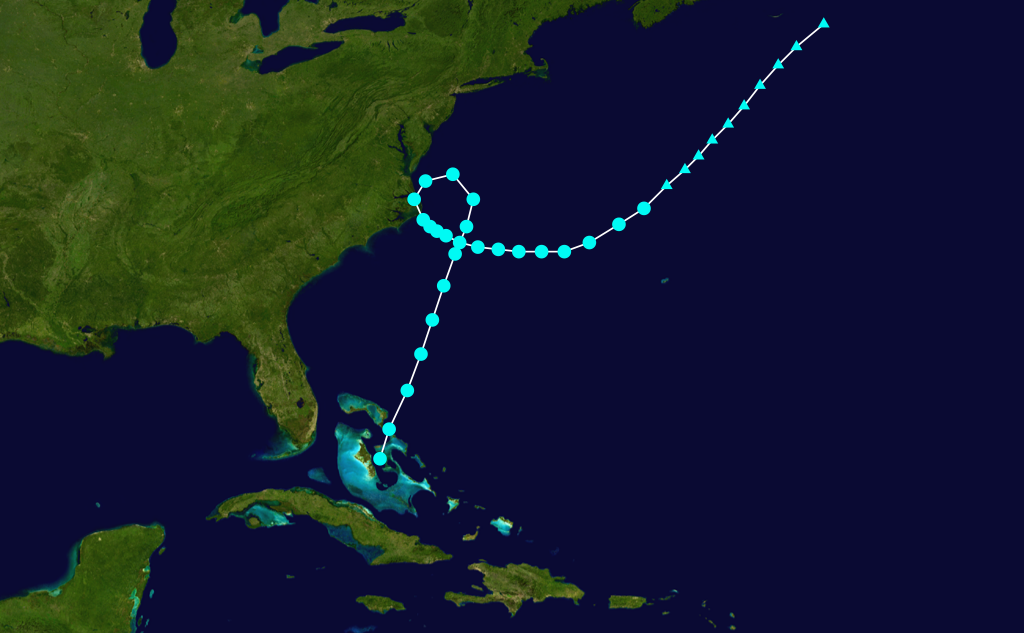
- Duration: October 23 – October 29
- Peak intensity: 65 mph (100 km/h) (1-min); ≤993 mbar (hPa)

The final tropical cyclone was located over the Bahamas on October 23. It moved north-northeastward and remained at the same intensity. By October 25, the storm began executing a cyclonic loop while offshore the East Coast of the United States. Around that time, the system attained its peak intensity with winds of 65 mph (100 km/h). Moving southwestward, the storm made landfall near Duck, North Carolina at 2300 UTC on October 25, at the same intensity. Early on October 26, the system curved southeastward and quickly moved offshore. It then moved eastward and later to the northeast, before becoming extratropical on October 29. Chenoweth also proposed the removing of this storm from HURDAT, arguing that weather maps indicate that it never acquired tropical characteristics.

Along much of the East Coast of the United States, the Weather Bureau warned about gales and rough seas. From Cape Hatteras, North Carolina to Maine, storm surge and tides resulted in considerable damage to boardwalks and beach cottages. In Virginia, storm surge caused a number of small crafts and a few ships to be washed ashore or destroyed. The James River rose to 5 feet (1.5 m) above high tide. A few cities experienced coastal flooding, including Chincoteague and Norfolk. The Willoughby Spit was split by the tides, washing away the Old Point Comfort railroad tracks. Cedar Island was "leveled to a mere flat breath of sand". Six fatalities were reported in Virginia, four of them from drowning in Newport News, while the other two were caused by electrocution.

== See also ==
- Atlantic hurricane reanalysis project
- Tropical cyclone observation
