= 1898 Windward Islands hurricane =

Category 2 Atlantic hurricane in 1898

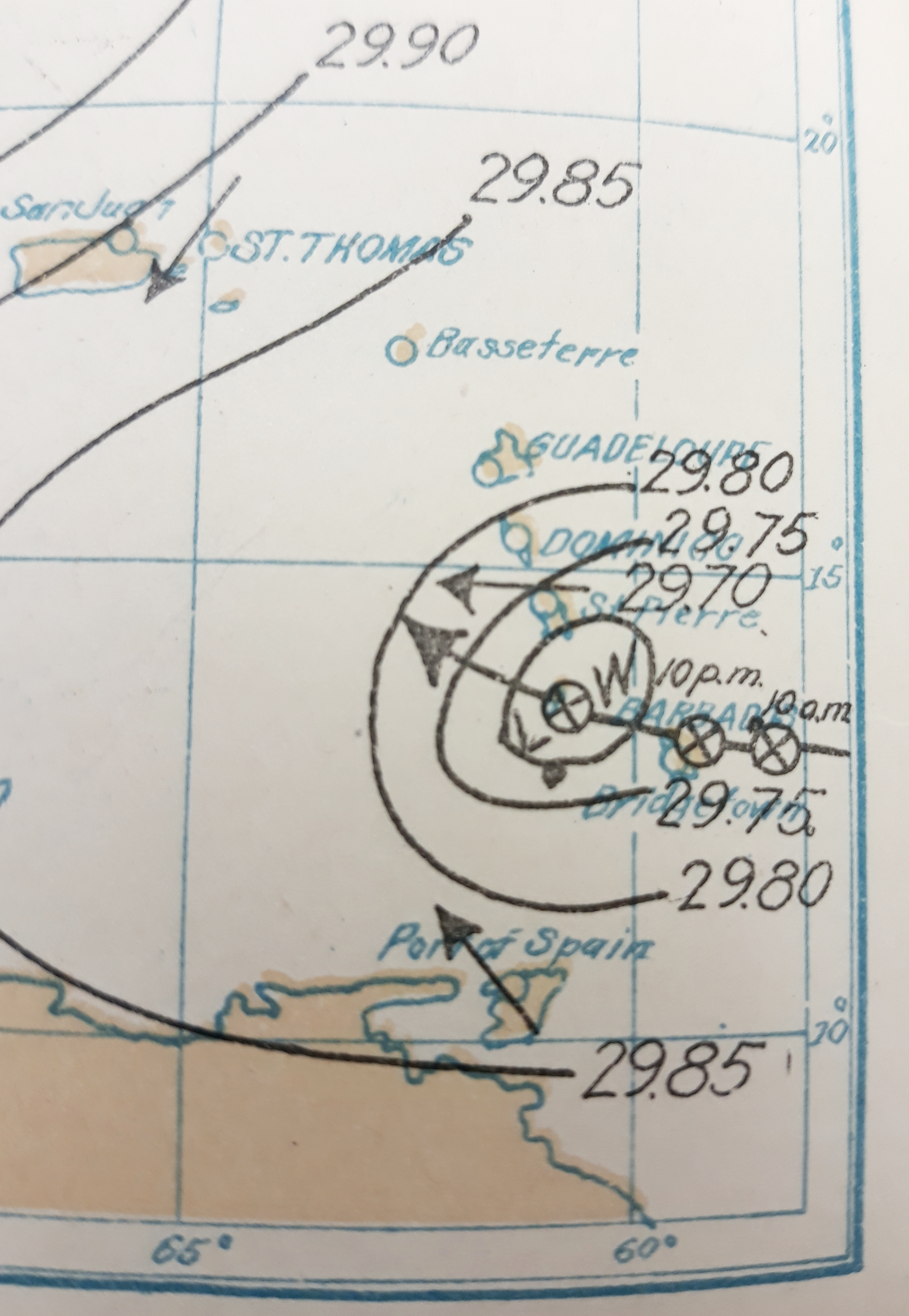
- Weather map depicting the hurricane moving through the Windward Islands on the morning of September 11

Meteorological history
- Formed: September 5, 1898 (Note: All times and dates are based on Coordinated Universal Time (UTC) unless otherwise noted.)
- Extratropical: September 20, 1898
- Dissipated: September 20, 1898

Category 2 hurricane
- 1-minute sustained (SSHWS/NWS)
- Highest winds: 110 mph (175 km/h)
- Lowest pressure: 965 mbar (hPa); 28.50 inHg

Overall effects
- Fatalities: At least 300 dead
- Damage: $2.5 million (Barbados only) (Note: All monetary values are in 1898 United States dollar unless otherwise noted.)
- Areas affected: Windward Islands (particularly Barbados, St. Lucia, and St. Vincent), Leeward Islands
- IBTrACS
- Part of the 1898 Atlantic hurricane season

The Windward Islands Hurricane was a strong, destructive hurricane that raged through the eastern Caribbean islands in the early part of September during the 1898 Atlantic hurricane season. An estimated 392 people died as a result of the storm. Damage on Barbados and St. Vincent was catastrophic.

== Meteorological history ==
Map plotting the storm's track and intensity, according to the Saffir–Simpson scale and based on data from HURDAT Map key Saffir–Simpson scale Tropical depression (≤38 mph, ≤62 km/h) Tropical storm (39–73 mph, 63–118 km/h) Category 1 (74–95 mph, 119–153 km/h) Category 2 (96–110 mph, 154–177 km/h) Category 3 (111–129 mph, 178–208 km/h) Category 4 (130–156 mph, 209–251 km/h) Category 5 (≥157 mph, ≥252 km/h) Unknown Storm type Tropical cyclone Subtropical cyclone Extratropical cyclone, remnant low, tropical disturbance, or monsoon depression

An article in the Monthly Weather Review published by the United States Weather Bureau described the Windward Islands hurricane as "the most important meteorological event of September, 1898". The origins of the hurricane are unclear due to the dearth of marine weather observations over the central Atlantic. A compilation of historical tropical cyclone tracks published by the National Climatic Data Center in 1993 listed the storm as having begun south of Cabo Verde on September 5. An analysis of the 1898 Atlantic hurricane season by hurricane expert José Fernández Partagás in 1996 made no modifications to the 1993 track due to the lack of available observations, as did a reanalysis of the storm conducted by the Atlantic Oceanographic and Meteorological Laboratory in 2003. The storm is first listed in the National Hurricane Center's Atlantic hurricane database at 11.2°N 26.9°W on September 5, 1898, as a tropical storm with estimated maximum sustained winds of 40 mph (65 km/h). (Note: HURricane DATa (HURDAT) is a database of historical tropical cyclones maintained by the National Hurricane Center. The database is routinely revised to incorporate new data.) The database depicts the storm tracking west with its wind speeds increasing incrementally, reaching hurricane-force over the central Atlantic on September 6. At around midday on September 9, the French barque Tourny encountered the storm near 12°2′N 54°2′W. The ship registered a minimum barometric pressure of around 985 mbar (hPa; 29.1 inHg) during the encounter, though a later assessment of the ship's barometer found that the instrument underestimated pressures by about 8 mbar (hPa; 0.25 inHg).

Observations from Martinique and Trinidad on the morning of September 10 tentatively indicated the presence of a tropical disturbance southeast of the Windward Islands, and falling pressures in Barbados later that day provided conclusive evidence of an approaching storm. The hurricane passed near Barbados on the night of September 10. No period of calm was reported in Bridgetown, suggesting that the storm's eye missed the city. An analysis of the storm presented to the Royal Meteorological Society (RMS) in December 1898 determined that the centre of the hurricane passed 18 mi (29 km) south of the island. HMS Alert encountered the storm while evacuating from Barbados on September 10, recording a minimum barometric pressure of 1002.4 mbar (hPa; 29.60 inHg) at 9:00 p.m. while the hurricane's centre was some 25 mi (40 km) to the northeast. The storm reached the vicinity of St. Lucia and St. Vincent during the day on September 11. The calm eye of the storm traversed southern St. Vincent, passing directly over Kingstown at around local noon. A minimum air pressure of 965.43 mbar (hPa; 28.509 inHg) was recorded at the Saint Vincent and the Grenadines Botanic Gardens at 11:40 a.m. Based on this measurement, the Atlantic hurricane reanalysis project estimated that the hurricane had maximum sustained winds of approximately 110 mph (175 km/h), an intensity equivalent to a Category 2 hurricane on the modern-day Saffir–Simpson scale. Partagás described the storm as nearly a major hurricane based on the pressure observation at St. Vincent.

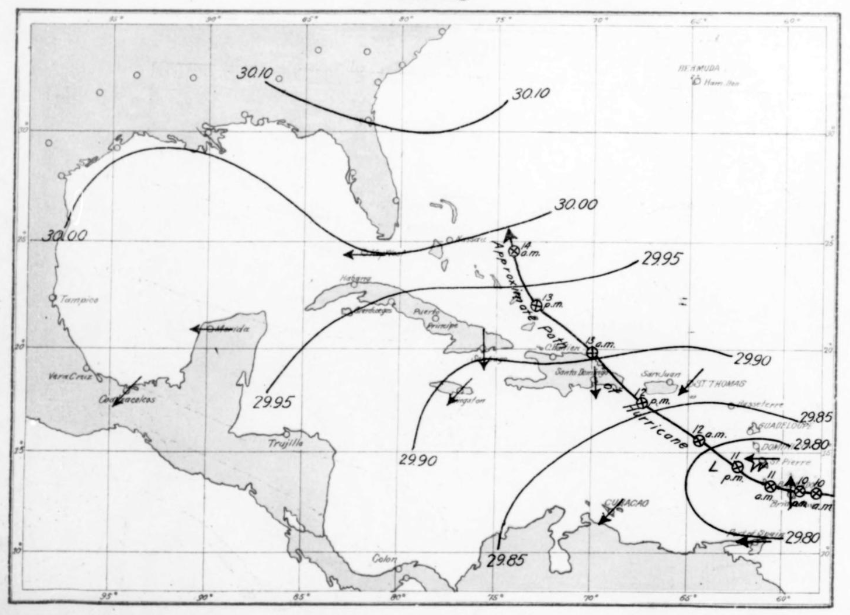
The U.S. Weather Bureau depicted the hurricane tracking northwest near Hispaniola and the Bahamas, but this portrayal was disputed by subsequent analyses.

After moving west past the Lesser Antilles, the hurricane curved northwest towards Aves Island with a forward speed of around 7.5 mi (12.1 km). The areal extent of the storm's winds expanded significantly during its passage of the Windward Islands: the region of strong winds spanned 35 mi (56 km) in diameter on approach to St. Vincent but subsequently extended outward to 170 mi (270 km) from the centre. The Weather Bureau noted that "after September 11 [the] storm lost strength rapidly, and there is no evidence at hand to show that during its subsequent northwesterly course over the eastern Caribbean Sea and the ocean to the northward it exhibited destructive violence." The bureau assessed the storm to have taken a track through the Mona Passage before the storm eventually dissipated east of the Bahamas on September 14. However, the RMS analysis disputed this description of the storm's path, instead depicting a track that took the storm northward between Puerto Rico and the Windward Islands. Compendiums of storms affecting Puerto Rico and the Dominican Republic do not suggest impacts from the hurricane. The centre of the storm likely passed near Sombrero Island on September 13, where a minimum air pressure of 998 mbar (29.48 inHg) was measured. According to the RMS analysis, the hurricane continued northward before curving to the northwest upon reaching the 23rd parallel north. On September 17, the storm reached the 30th parallel north and began accelerating to the northeast at an average forward speed of around 24 mph (39 km/h). The storm spanned around 400 mi (640 km) in diameter when it passed near Bermuda and expanded to around 450 mi (720 km) in diameter when it tracked east of Nova Scotia. The RMS analysis located the storm at around 42°N 42°W on September 20. However, the Atlantic hurricane database depicts the storm completing extratropical transition by September 20 and taking a track across Newfoundland before dissipating in the Labrador Sea later that day.

== Preparations and impact ==
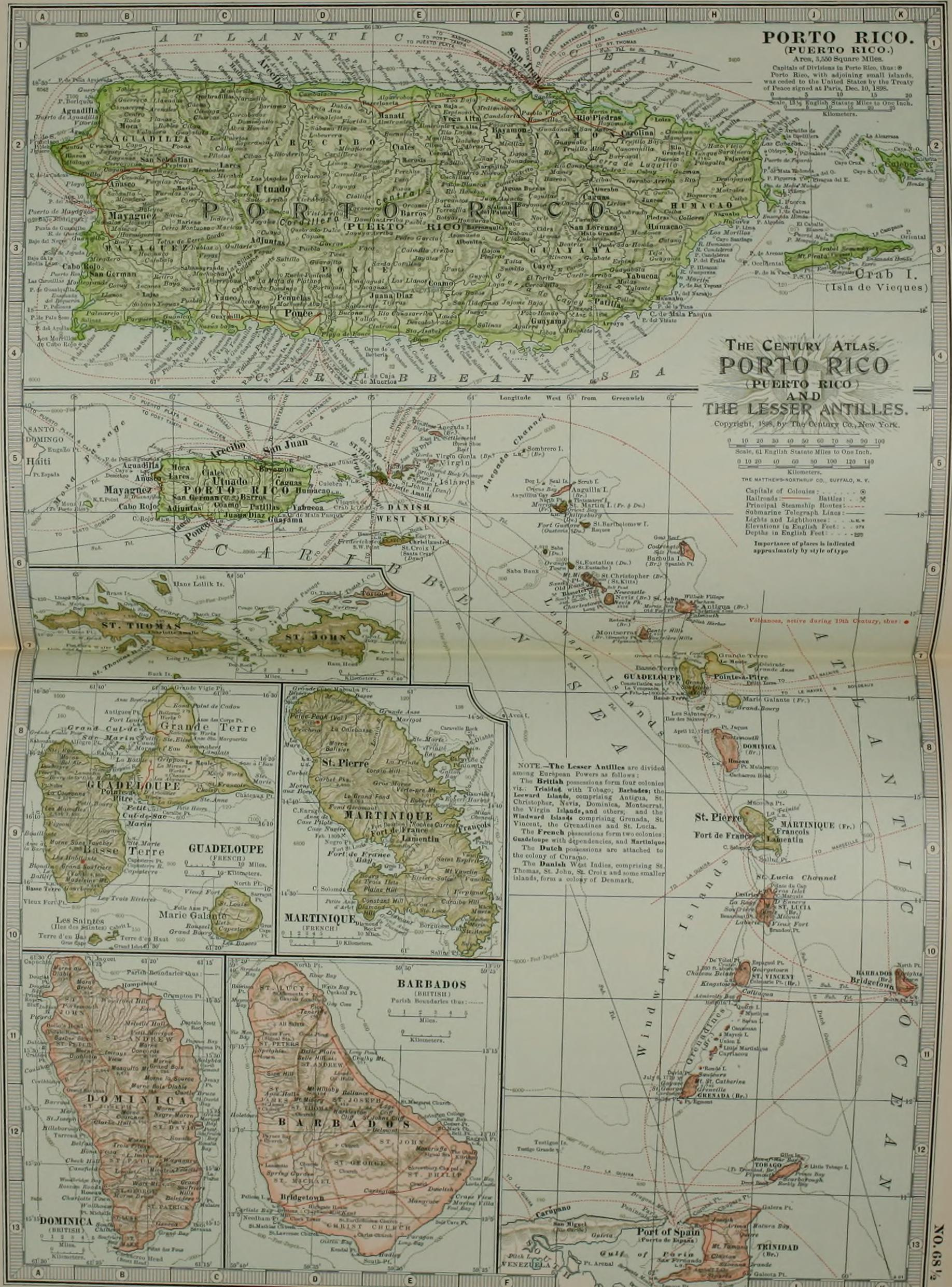
Map of the Lesser Antilles and Puerto Rico from the 1896 edition of the Century Dictionary

=== Barbados ===
Well east of Barbados, the French barque Tourney encountered the storm around midday on September 9 at 12°2′N 54°2′W. The ship lost all sail and nearly all of its rice cargo, and over the course of two days it was blown 60 mi (97 km) off course. Rain showers were frequent in Barbados between September 1 and September 10, but such weather conditions were typical for the island. More inclement weather began to prevail in Barbados ahead of the hurricane on September 6, continuing for several days with showers and thunderstorms. Despite the frequent rainfall, the air pressure held steady for several days. (Note: An approaching hurricane is associated with a decrease in air pressure ahead of the storm.) The existence of an approaching hurricane remained inconclusive until September 10, when observations suggested a tropical cyclone was present southeast of Barbados, and the air pressure began to fall rapidly. These findings were transmitted to the U.S. Weather Bureau in Washington, D.C. at 12:40 p.m. that day by P. McDonough, a Weather Bureau Observer stationed at Bridgetown. In response, the U.S. Weather Bureau communicated hurricane warnings to the bureau's stations in the Lesser Antilles, requesting the stations to disseminate warnings to those in their purview. Additional advisories were transmitted throughout the Caribbean Sea to support observation of the storm. Initial forecasts from the U.S. Weather Bureau projected that the hurricane would track slowly northwest with increasing strength. Ships moored at the Bridgetown harbour and Carlisle Bay either left or were secured further in advance of the hurricane. The hurricane warning efforts of the newly established West Indian Weather Service of the U.S. Weather Bureau were later lauded by the press, including the Daily Gleaner, The New York Times, and the Times-Democrat. However, McDonough wrote that the many locals "pooh-poohed the information given out," believing that the island was "immune" from hurricanes due to the long period of time elapsed since the last destructive storm.

The hurricane impacted Barbados on the night of September 10–11, a night that the Barbados Agricultural Reporter described as one that would "live forever in the memory of the present generation of Barbadians." The storm's forces were experienced for around ten hours, with the strongest winds buffeting the island from around 7:30 p.m. on September 10 to 4 a.m. on September 11. Gale-force winds were experienced after 6:30 p.m. and hurricane-force winds set in after 9 p.m. McDonough recorded a peak one-minute sustained wind of 75 mph (121 km/h) at 10:18 p.m. The shelter housing the associated anemometer and other weather instruments was subsequently destroyed by the wind, damaging the instruments or leaving them unusable. McDonough believed that winds were at their strongest between 11 p.m. and midnight. Winds in Bridgetown peaked at 62 mph (100 km/h). McDonough also recorded a minimum air pressure of 997.7 mbar (hPa; 29.462 inHg) at 9:20 p.m. and a total rainfall accumulation of 11.42 in (290 mm) between 6 p.m. September 10 and 10:30 a.m. September 12. The September 17 issue of The Barbados Advocate provided the following summation of the storm's impact:

Fiercer and more destructive hurricanes may have visited the West Indies in years past, but taking into consideration the general condition of her industry and its gloomy prospects, never has a more appalling calamity fallen on this island since first it rose out of these western seas, than the fearful hurricane that ravaged it from shore to shore on [the night of September 10].

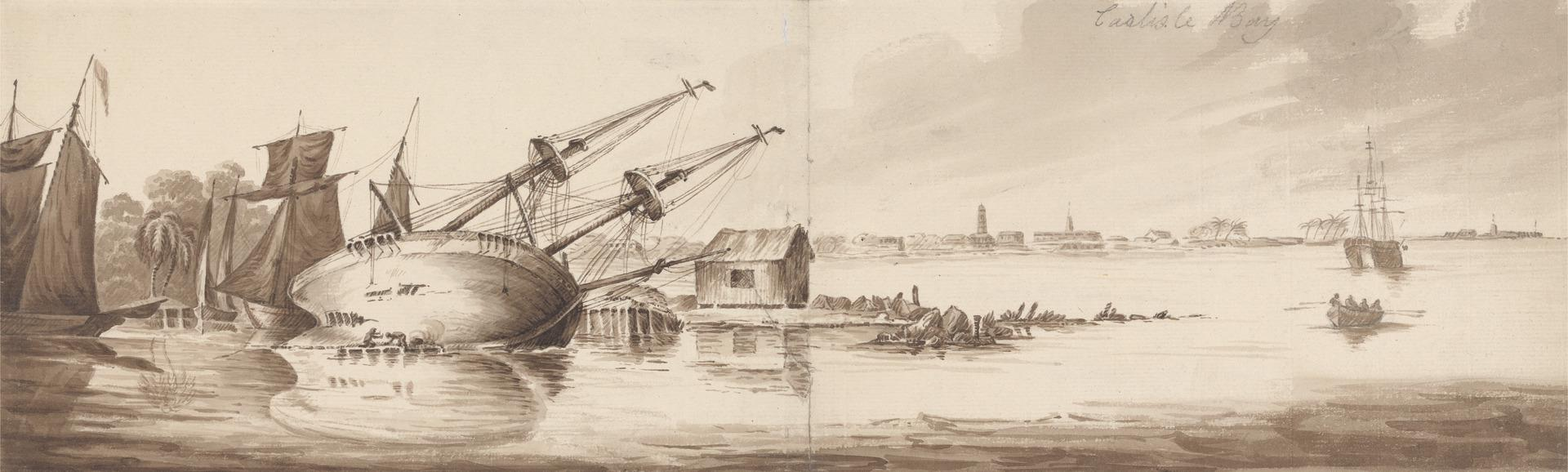
Many ships in Carlisle Bay (drawing by Paul Sandby c. 1820) were driven out to sea by the wind and marooned on distant reefs or destroyed.

The hurricane killed 83 people and injured 150 on Barbados according to the U.S. Weather Bureau, though a report published in the Quarterly Journal of the Royal Meteorological Society documented 115 fatalities on the island. McDonough reported that 5,062 houses were completely destroyed and another 2,359 sustained at least partial damage, displacing some 40,000–45,000 people. The RMS report enumerated 11,400 destroyed homes and 50,000 displaced people. Property damage resulting from the hurricane amounted to US$2.5 million according to the U.S. Weather Bureau. Impacts from the hurricane were experienced throughout Barbados, though the most severe effects occurred along the eastern and southern areas of the island. Despite being secured by additional anchors, several ships harboured at Carlisle Bay were severed from their anchorage and blown out to sea by the hurricane and marooned on reefs near Bridgeport and 100 mi (160 km) to the west along reefs near St. Vincent. Five ships were driven out to sea with their anchors dragged along the seafloor, losing all sail and drifting broadside for a distance of roughly 105 mi (169 km) over the course of 15 hours before beaching near Georgetown, St. Vincent. The crews of the vessels Grace Lynwood, Lapland, and Loando were rescued after being blown onto the St. Vincent reefs. The vessels Florence, Florence B. Parr, Kate Florence, and Lovdahl were all blown out to sea with no subsequent correspondence. The Campania, Elmo, Ocean Traveller, and many lighters were beached on reefs near Bridgeport and deemed total losses. Smaller ships were destroyed by the heavy surf.

A section of the Bridgetown wharf was severed by the rough seas, and waves crashed over the wharf onto the city streets. The streets were rendered impassable by the storm, snarling vehicle traffic and streetcar service; the Bridgetown streetcar service was restored in limited capacity on September 12. The suburbs of Bridgetown sustained considerable damage, with trees snapped or uprooted and frame houses razed. Strong winds blew down thousands of telephone poles, incapacitating the island's entire telephone system. St. Michael and Belleville also suffered extensively, with The Times reporting them as "totally demolished". The sugar cane crop also experienced significant losses.

=== St. Vincent and St. Lucia ===
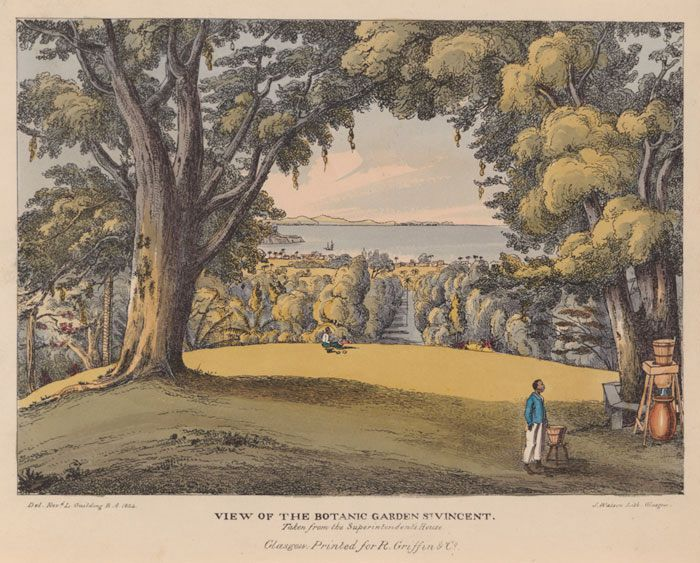
The lowest pressure measured in connection with the hurricane was measured at a station in the Saint Vincent Botanic Garden.

St. Vincent and St. Lucia sustained severe effects comparable to those experienced on Barbados. Rough seas began to encroach upon the St. Vincent coast 20 hours before the hurricane arrived. By 3 p.m. on September 10, falling air pressures on St. Vincent began to indicate that a hurricane was imminent, prompting warnings of the approaching storm. Strong winds battered St. Vincent on September 11, uprooting trees and disrupting telecommunications. The hurricane's winds were at their strongest between 1 and 2 p.m., and the storm's effects largely subsided by 3 p.m. H. Powell, the curator of the Saint Vincent and the Grenadines Botanic Gardens, estimated that wind speeds reached 90–100 mph (140–160 km/h). A minimum barometric pressure of 965.43 mbar (hPa; 28.509 inHg) was recorded during a period of calm on the island. Between 9 a.m. on September 11 and 9 a.m. on September 12, 9.17 in (233 mm) of rainfall was recorded at the Botanic Gardens; an estimated 14 in (360 mm) of rain fell at St. Vincent during the entirety of the storm.

Powell described a previous hurricane in 1886 as being "mere 'child's play'" compared to the 1898 storm in St. Vincent, and reported that some residents described the hurricane as "in every way more destructive" than a significant hurricane in 1831. The death toll in St. Vincent tallied around in the hundreds; the RMS analysis reported roughly 200 fatalities while The New York Times reported around 300 fatalities. Around 6,000 homes were destroyed or irreparably damaged, displacing approximately 20,000 people. Strong winds destroyed almost every church and chapel on the island and uprooted numerous trees. Nearly all of the large trees at the Botanic Gardens were downed. Trees and homes that withstood the northerly winds accompanying the initial approach of the hurricane were destroyed by the opposing winds that followed. Heavy rain from the hurricane produced floods that cascaded down mountainsides, razing entire villages and estates. Shipping in Kingstown was wrecked by the rough seas. The villages of Richmond and Wallibou were a "complete wreck", with no houses remaining. In Chateaubelair, many houses were demolished, while a few were still standing after the storm, albeit with severe damage. Forty-five deaths occurred in the village. Similar impact was reported in Cumberland, with one death. Only one house was not destroyed at Barrouallie. Thirty fatalities were reported, eleven of which occurred after a church which people sought refuge in was wrecked. In Layou, only the police barracks remained standing.

Much of the damage in St. Lucia was inflicted by a ten-hours-long rainfall that led to floods and landslides. Valleys in St. Lucia temporarily became lakes after accumulating floodwaters. A landslide triggered by heavy rain in St. Lucia engulfed homes within a 3 mi (4.8 km) stretch of a valley. Castries Harbour suffered heavy damage due to the heavy seas.

=== Elsewhere ===
William B. Stockman, a U.S. Weather Bureau forecaster serving under the agency's West Indian Weather Service at Kingston, Jamaica, directed the raising of hurricane signals at Saint-Pierre, Martinique, St. Kitts, and St. Thomas after receiving weather observations on September 10 indicative of a hurricane. Spanish ships delayed their departures from San Juan, Puerto Rico, upon receiving notice of the storm.

Within the Lesser Antilles outside of Barbados, St. Lucia, and St. Vincent, impacts were comparatively minor and limited to roiled seas and heavy rain. Impacts in the Grenadines were minor outside of Bequia, located just south of St. Vincent. Thunderstorms and rainfall spread to other parts of the Windward Islands, with rainfall totals reaching 2.25 in (57 mm) at Grenada and 5.5 in (140 mm) at Dominica. A landslide in Trois-Rivières, Guadeloupe, engulfed two homes, causing nine deaths. The sloop Marie Stella capsized off Goyave, resulting in another nine deaths near Guadeloupe.

The storm passed near St. Kitts without causing much damage. Winds at Basseterre peaked at 58 mph (93 km/h) on September 12. Rainfall accumulations between the morning of September 12 and the morning of September 13 reached 5.5 in (140 mm) on St. Kitts; roughly the same amount was recorded in Antigua. Around 20 in (510 mm) of rain was recorded at Nevis throughout the storm and 17.25 in (438 mm) of rain was recorded in Montserrat over a 48-hour period.

The ship Fluminense arrived in Barbados with damage from a storm encounter on September 18 after departing from New York. Partagás surmised that the vessel likely encountered the hurricane somewhere between Cape Hatteras and Bermuda. On September 19, the ship Osorno possibly encountered the storm en route from Bordeaux to New York, experiencing 24 hours of gale-force winds. One crewmember was washed overboard and drowned.

== See also ==
- Hurricane Six (1886)
- 1891 Martinique hurricane
- Hurricane Edith (1963)
- Hurricane Tomas
