= List of Georgia hurricanes =

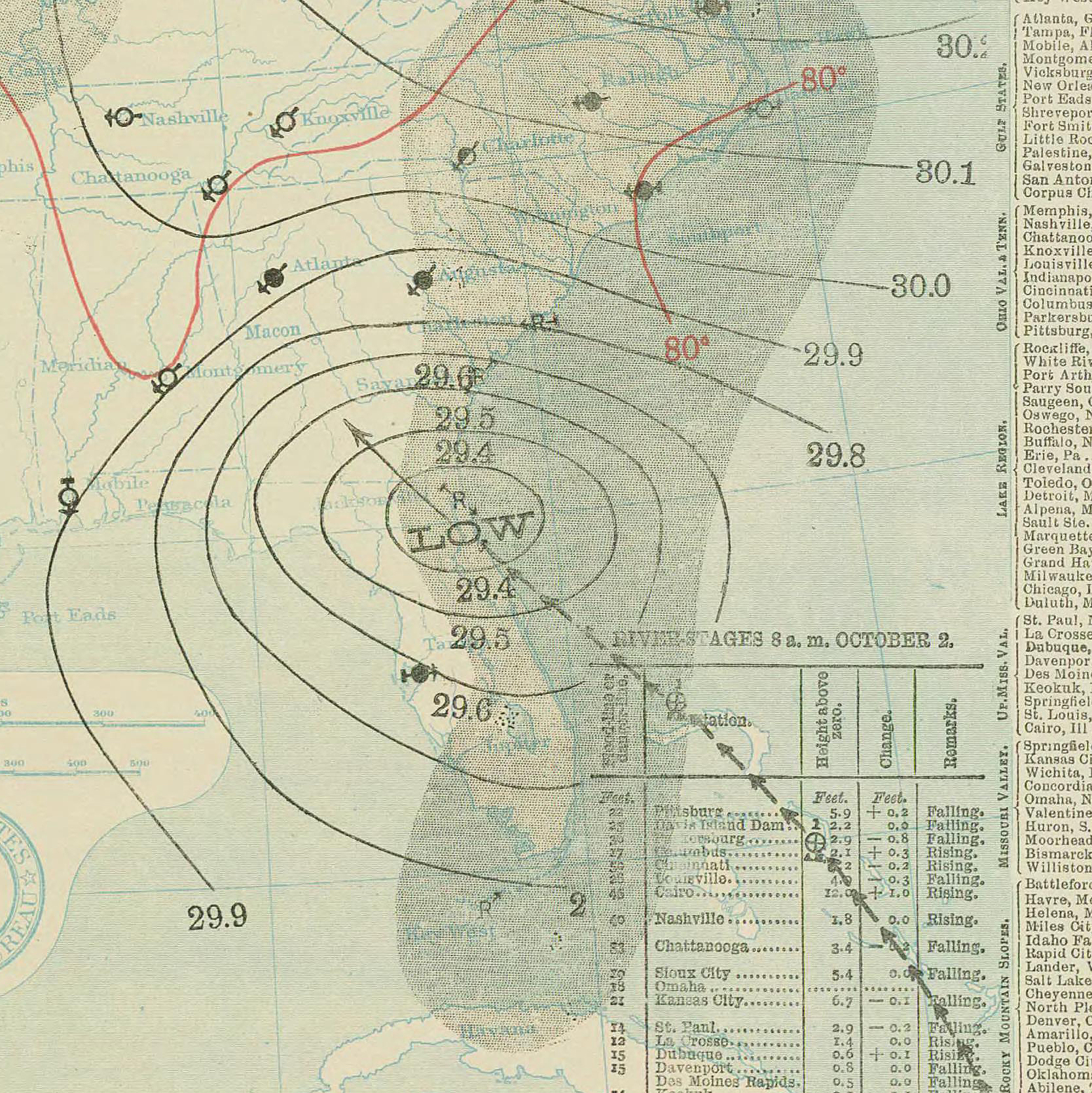
Surface weather analysis of the 1898 Georgia hurricane on October 2. That hurricane was the strongest hurricane on record to hit the state and was the most recent major hurricane to strike Georgia.

The list of Georgia hurricanes includes tropical or subtropical cyclones that have affected the U.S. state of Georgia. Fewer hurricanes have hit Georgia directly (due to its location and shorter coastline) than other states in the Southeast, with an estimated return period of 10–11 years. The last system to make landfall in the state at hurricane intensity was Hurricane David in 1979. Further, only three major hurricanes have struck Georgia, the most recent of which being in 1898. However, numerous tropical cyclones have passed near or through the state.

== List of storms ==
Saffir–Simpson scale
TD	TS	C1	C2	C3	C4	C5

Most of the following are tropical cyclones that passed through the states after weakening from their peak.

=== Pre-1950 ===
- August 27, 1893 – Sea Islands Hurricane hit Sea Islands, causing major damage.
- August 30 – September 1, 1898 – second storm hit "near South Carolina border", putting it at mouth of Savannah River just downstream from Savannah.
- October 2, 1898 – 1898 Georgia hurricane struck Cumberland Island as a category 4 hurricane with 135 mph (215 km/h) winds, causing heavy damage amounting to around $1 million, and 179 casualties.
- October 15, 1947 – 1947 Florida-Georgia Hurricane.

=== 1950–1959 ===
- Hurricane Baker (1950)
- Hurricane Easy (1950)
- Hurricane King
- Hurricane Able (1951)
- Hurricane Able (1952)
- Tropical Storm Alice (1953)
- Hurricane Florence (1953)
- Tropical Storm Hazel (1953)
- Tropical Storm One (1956)
- Hurricane Flossy (1956)
- Tropical Storm Ten (1956)
- Tropical Storm One (1957)
- Hurricane Audrey
- Tropical Storm Debbie (1957)
- Tropical Storm Esther (1957)
- Tropical Storm Arlene (1959)
- 1959 Escuminac disaster
- Hurricane Cindy (1959)
- Hurricane Gracie
- Tropical Storm Irene (1959)

=== 1960–1969 ===
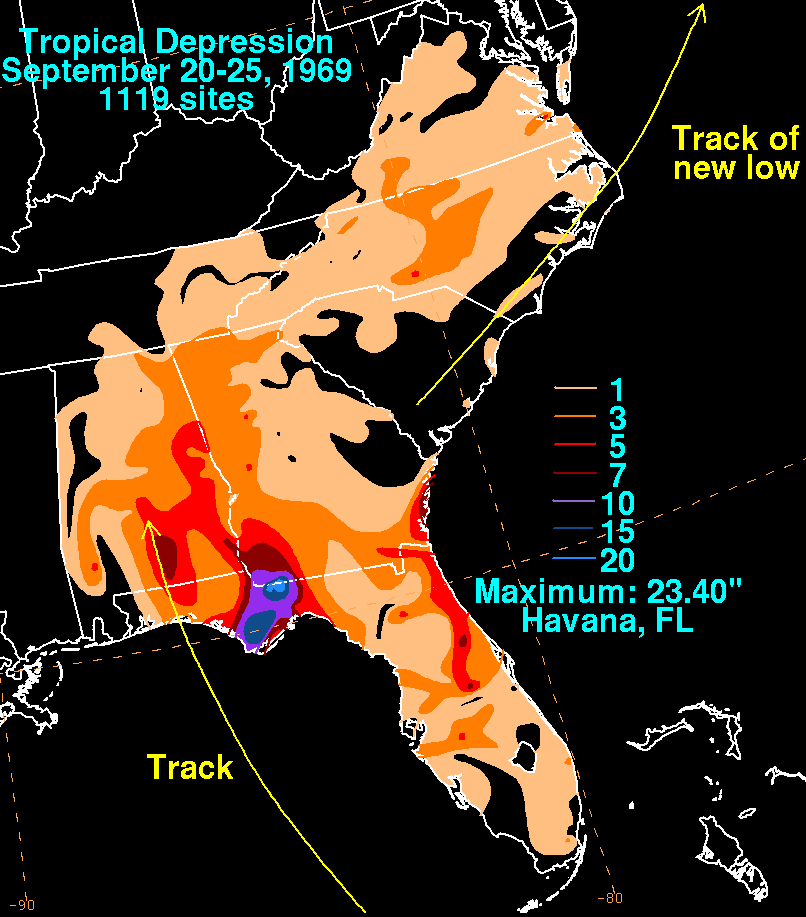
Rainfall totals associated with Tropical Depression Twenty-Nine

- Tropical Storm Brenda (1960)
- Hurricane Donna
- Hurricane Ethel (1960)
- Tropical Storm Florence (1960)
- Hurricane Alma (1962)
- September Gulf of Mexico tropical depression (1962)
- Tropical Storm One (1964)
- Hurricane Cleo
- Hurricane Dora
- Hurricane Hilda
- June 11–15, 1965 – An unnamed tropical storm produced rainfall across much of Georgia, with a peak amount of 7.37 inches (187 mm) in Adel.
- September 10–12, 1965 – The outer bands of Hurricane Betsy dropped light rainfall in the state, peaking at 3.48 inches (88 mm) in Ailey.
- September 30 – October 1, 1965 – The remnants of Tropical Storm Debbie resulted in precipitation across much of Georgia, with up to 8.65 inches (220 mm) observed in Greenville. In the Brunswick area, heavy rains flooded airfields and canals.
- June 9–12, 1966 – Tropical Storm Alma produced 44 mph (71 km/h) wind gusts and 2.18 in (55 mm) in Savannah. High winds damaged a few houses and downed trees near Albany, Georgia. The winds overturned a bus at Fort Gordon, injuring 11 soldiers. The storm caused about $50,000 in damage in the state.
- June 6–7, 1968 – Tropical Storm Abby brought rainfall to much of Georgia, peaking at 7.92 inches (201 mm) at the Blackbeard Island National Wildlife Refuge. Sustained winds between 35 and 40 mph (56 and 64 km/h) downed power lines. Tides of 2 to 3 feet (0.61 to 0.91 m) above normal caused minor coastal flooding. Overall, damage was minor, reaching less than $100,000.
- October 19–20, 1968 – Hurricane Gladys dropped rain across roughly two-thirds of Georgia, with a peak amount of 3.42 inches (87 mm) near Jesup.
- August 17–20, 1969 – The outer bands of Hurricane Camille dropped light rainfall, particularly in the northern portions of the state, peaking at 4.36 inches (111 mm) near Elberton.
- September 20–22, 1969 – Tropical Depression Twenty-Nine dropped torrential rainfall across southwestern Georgia, with up to 22 inches (560 mm) observed in Attapulgus. Severe local flooding ensued, particularly in Decatur County, causing damage to property and crops, mostly to peanuts that were not threshed.
- October 1–2, 1969 – A subtropical storm brought light rainfall to the eastern portions of the state, peaking at 6.01 inches (153 mm) in Folkston.

=== 1970–1979 ===
- May 24–26, 1970 – Tropical Depression Alma dropped light rainfall in Georgia, peaking at 4.62 inches (117 mm) in Alapaha.
- Tropical Storm Becky (1970)
- Tropical Depression Eight (1971)
- Tropical Storm Doria (1971)
- Tropical Depression Eleven (1971)
- Hurricane Edith (1971)
- Subtropical Storm Alpha (1972)
- Hurricane Agnes
- Hurricane Dawn (1972)
- Tropical Depression Eleven (1973)
- Tropical Depression Thirteen (1973)
- 1974 Florida subtropical storm
- Hurricane Carmen
- Tropical Storm Amy (1975)
- Tropical Depression Nine (1975)
- Hurricane Eloise
- Subtropical Storm One (1976)
- Tropical Storm Dottie
- Subtropical Storm Three (1976)
- Hurricane Babe (1977)
- Tropical Depression One (1979)
- Hurricane David
- Hurricane Frederic

=== 1980–1989 ===
- Hurricane Dennis (1981)
- 1982 Florida subtropical storm
- Tropical Storm Chris (1982)
- Tropical Depression One (1984)
- Tropical Storm Isidore (1984)
- Tropical Depression Seventeen (1984)
- Hurricane Bob (1985)
- Hurricane Danny (1985)
- Hurricane Elena
- Tropical Storm Isabel (1985)
- Hurricane Juan (1985)
- Hurricane Kate (1985)
- Hurricane Bonnie (1986)
- Hurricane Charley (1986)
- 1987 Gulf Coast tropical storm
- Tropical Depression Nine (1987)
- Tropical Depression Fourteen (1987)
- Tropical Depression Four (1988)
- Tropical Storm Chris (1988)
- Tropical Depression Ten (1988)
- Hurricane Florence (1988)
- Tropical Storm Keith (1988)
- Tropical Storm Allison (1989)
- Hurricane Hugo

=== 1990–1999 ===
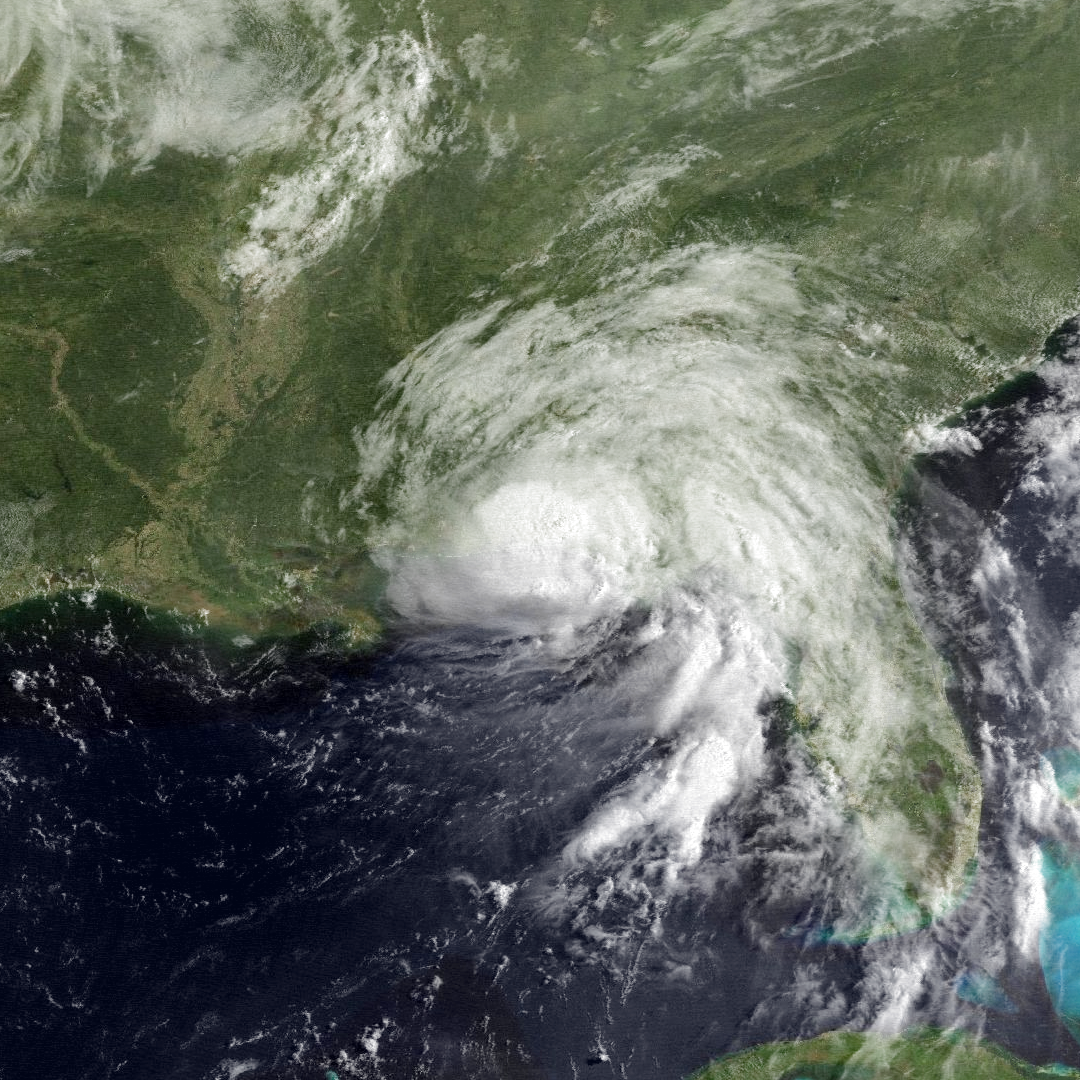
Tropical Storm Alberto making landfall in Florida in 1994; Alberto became the costliest tropical cyclone in the history of Georgia

- October 12–14, 1990 – The remnants of Tropical Storm Marco and moisture from the remains of Hurricane Klaus combined, producing heavy rainfall in Georgia, peaking at 19.89 inches (505 mm) near Louisville. Some roads in eastern Georgia were flooded up to 6 feet (1.8 m) deep. The flooding resulted in some power outages. In Augusta, heavy precipitation forced 300 people to evacuate, while police officers rescued people in flooded cars. About 450 were left homeless. A tornado was spawned in Brantley County, which destroyed 25 unoccupied homes. Overall, there were five deaths and about $42 million in damage.
- June 29–July 3, 1991 – The precursor of Tropical Storm Ana dropped light rainfall in southeastern Georgia.
- August 27–28, 1992 – Dissipating Hurricane Andrew produced tropical storm force winds in Atlanta. Several damaging tornadoes were spawned in the state, causing about $100,000 in losses. Additionally, precipitation peaked at 4.6 inches (120 mm) near Mountain City.
- August 28, 1992 – Although located well offshore, the outerbands of Tropical Storm Earl produced light rainfall in Georgia.
- Tropical Storm Alberto (1994) In Georgia, rainfall from the tropical cyclone peaked at 27.85 in (707 mm) near Americus. Due to a previously stalled cold front, which subsequently caused Alberto to remain stationary, the ground was already saturated with rainfall. Virtually all of the precipitation became instant runoff into streams and rivers. Peak discharges along the Flint and Ocmulgee rivers exceeded 100-year flood levels. At least 100 dam and recreational watersheds suffered severe damage or were destroyed. Many roads were inundated, forcing the closure of 175 roads and 1,000 bridges. Damage to highway infrastructure exceeded $130 million. Approximately 471,000 acres (191,000 ha) of croplands were submerged, causing about $100 million in damage to agriculture. Fifteen of the United States Geological Survey's (USGS) gaging stations were severely damaged or demolished, forcing data to be collected manually and reported by cellphone. Due to flooded water system, approximately 500,000 people were temporarily left without drinking water. There were 31 deaths in the state, most of which from cars being swept onto flooded roads or into swollen creeks. With $750 million in damage, Alberto was considered the costliest tropical cyclone in Georgia, while the flooding was considered the worst in the history of the state.
- Tropical Depression Two (1994)
- Tropical Storm Beryl (1994)
- Tropical Depression Ten (1994)
- Hurricane Gordon (1994)
- Hurricane Allison (1995)
- Hurricane Erin (1995)
- Tropical Storm Jerry (1995)
- Hurricane Opal
- Tropical Storm Josephine (1996)
- Hurricane Danny (1997)
- Hurricane Earl (1998)
- Hurricane Georges
- Tropical Storm Hermine (1998)
- Hurricane Dennis (1999)
- Hurricane Floyd
- September 21–22, 1999 – The outer bands of Tropical Storm Harvey produced up to 2.9 inches (74 mm) of rainfall in Brunswick.
- October 15–17, 1999 – In association with Hurricane Irene, tropical cyclone warnings and watches were posted in Georgia, with a tropical storm watch for the entire coast and later a hurricane warning from Savannah northward. However, the storm brought only very light precipitation to the state, peaking at 0.56 inches (14 mm) near Savannah.

=== 2000–2009 ===
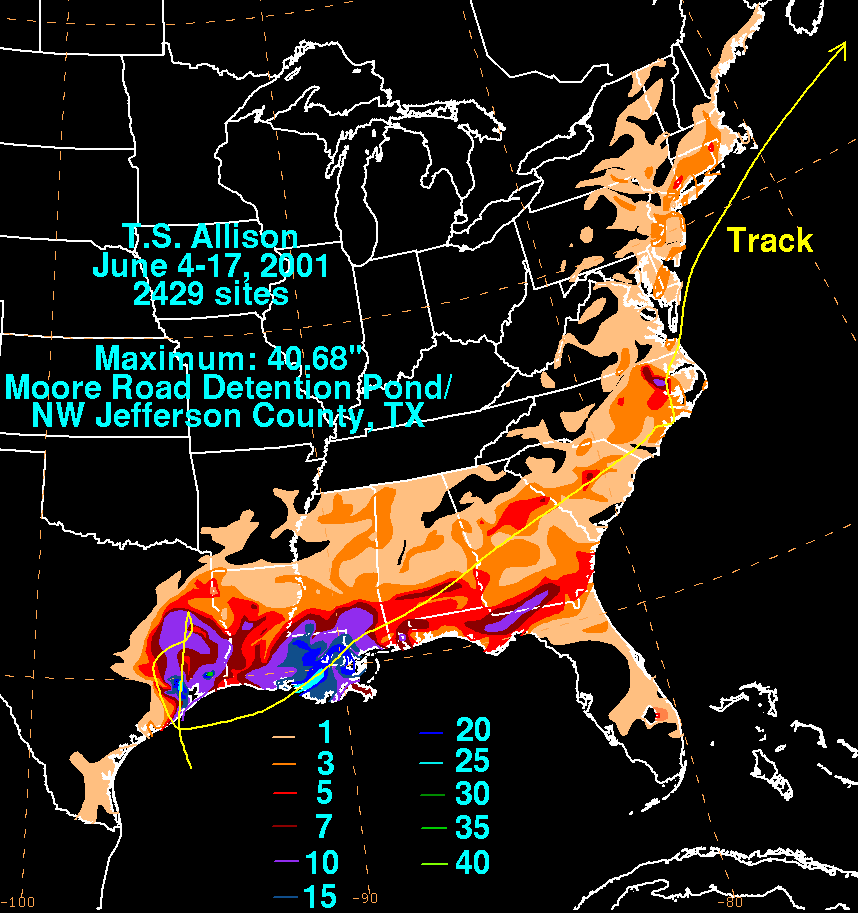
Map of rainfall totals associated with Tropical Storm Allison

- September 18–19, 2000 – Hurricane Gordon crossed the state as it was weakening and transitioning into an extratropical cyclone. The storm produced light rainfall in southeastern Georgia, peaking at 4.14 inches (105 mm) in Woodbine.
- September 22–23, 2000 – Tropical Storm Helene moved across Georgia and dropped rainfall across much of the state, with a peak total of 5.13 inches (130 mm) in Dunwoody.
- June 11–13, 2001 – Tropical Storm Allison brought heavy rain and flooding to many counties in central and east central Georgia. Precipitation in the state peaked at 12.56 inches (319 mm) near Quitman. In the cities of Athens, Crawfordville, Eatonton, Lexington, Milledgeville, 24 hour rainfall amounts of 5 to 8 inches (130 to 200 mm) were common. The Little River crested at its highest level on record, while the Oconee River exceeded flood stage by 2 feet (0.61 m). Several counties were impacted by flooding, with many roads and bridges being washed out. In Greene County, a bridge was washed out, leaving 25 residents of a neighborhood stranded. Over 20 roads were inundated in the county; Baldwin, Brooks, Lowndes, Pulaski, Putnam, and Taliaferro counties also reported that numerous secondary roads and some state highways were flooded. In Pulaski County, a road in the southwest part of the county was washed out, leaving a 10 feet (3.0 m) canyon. In Milledgeville, an Animal Hospital had to be evacuated when a nearby creek rising out of its banks threatened to flood the facility.
- August 4–7, 2001 – Tropical Storm Barry dropped light rainfall in Georgia, peaking at 2.39 inches (61 mm) in Valdosta.
- September 11–13, 2001 – The outer bands of Hurricane Gabrielle produced 3.84 inches (98 mm) of precipitation in Brunswick.
- July 9–13, 2002 – The precursor to Tropical Storm Arthur dropped light rainfall in the state, with up to 3.68 inches (93 mm) near Dallas.
- August 4, 2002 – The outer bands of Tropical Storm Bertha dropped minimal amounts of precipitation in southeastern Georgia.
- Tropical Storm Hanna (2002) – Hanna dropped heavy rainfall across much of Georgia, peaking at 15.56 inches (395 mm) at Donalsonville, 12.47 inches (317 mm) at Carrollton, and 11.23 in (285 mm) at Embry. The heavy rainfall helped to relieve a persistent drought. However, climatologists determined that the rainfall did not fully alleviate the dry conditions. The band of thunderstorms produced gusts of 40 to 50 mph (64 to 80 km/h), downing trees and power lines. In the Atlanta area, 48,000 customers experienced power outages. The winds tore a roof off a house and damaged a number of mobile homes. The heavy rainfall caused severe flooding; in Donalsonville, 250 houses and 50 businesses suffered water damage, while another 35 were damaged in nearby Miller County. Roads were flooded, including parts of U.S. Route 27. Crop damage was significant in the state; about $19 million in damage to cotton and peanut crops were reported.
- Hurricane Isidore – Weakening Hurricane Isidore produced wind gusts of 30 to 35 mph (48 to 56 km/h) in northern Georgia. With saturated soils across the region from recent heavy rainfall, several weak and small trees were blown down. Some of the trees fell down on power lines. The hardest hit areas included Blairsville, Blue Ridge, Cedartown, and Ellijay. Catoosa, Floyd, Gilmer, Gordon, Murray, Union, and Whitfield counties all reported that a number of trees and power lines were down. In Union County, nearly two dozen trees were blown down, one of which caused damage to a house. Rainfall from the storm peaked at 5.12 inches (130 mm) near Mountain City, causing local flooding in some areas. In Lawrenceville, two offices of the Gwinnett Daily Post flooded. At one of the office buildings, there was up to 1 foot (0.30 m) of standing water, a floating concrete slab, and about 2,300 sections of paper and advertisements were soaked. Mud and other debris were also reported in the two buildings.
- October 9–11, 2002 – Hurricane Kyle dropped moderate rainfall that peaked at 5.35 inches (136 mm) at Hunter Army Airfield. Most of the precipitation fell in a 12-hour period, which flooded roads and low-lying areas; several roads were closed, and numerous vehicles stalled in the floodwaters.

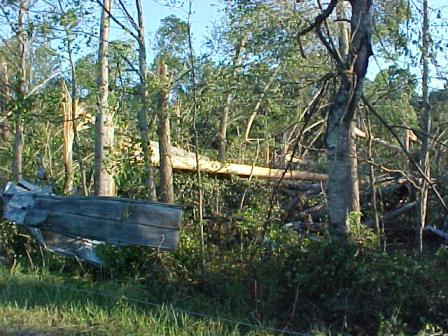
Tree damage from a tornado spawned by Tropical Storm Bill in Morgan County

- Tropical Storm Bill (2003) – The storm produced moderate rainfall in northwestern Georgia, which peaked at 7.1 inches (180 mm) in Monroe. Precipitation caused flooding in numerous locations around the Atlanta metropolitan area, leaving some roads impassable or closed. An F1 tornado touched down near Pennington and caused severe damage to two dairy sheds, a tractor, and three metal storage buildings. The tornado then destroyed a hay barn, a carport, and a car inside the carport as well, while also causing a tree to fall. It continued through a forested area, toppling hundreds of trees. As it entered a more urban area, it downed 30 isolated trees, some of which fell on a portion of Interstate 20, temporarily closing the roadway. The tornado damaged seven houses, primarily to roof damage, although one experienced damage to several windows, while another had a utility trailer and a car damaged by fallen trees; a commercial building was damaged as well. An F2 tornado in Clito knocked down trees and damaged mobile homes. Severe thunderstorms caused considerable damage to a house near Louisville and knocked down several trees. Bill also caused thunderstorms in Kite which uprooted several trees onto a car and a house. One man in Atlanta died due to a falling tree. Damage totaled to $244,500.
- Tropical Depression Seven (2003) – It made landfall near St. Catherines Island. It brought light rainfall to the eastern and southern portions of Georgia, peaking at 5.17 inches (131 mm) in Savannah.
- Tropical Storm Grace (2003) – It brought light and isolated rainfall to Georgia, generally about 1 inch (25 mm).
- Tropical Storm Henri (2003) – The outerbands brought generally light rainfall to the southern portions of the state, reaching about 5 inches (130 mm).
- Tropical Storm Bonnie (2004) – This storm dropped generally light rainfall in Georgia.
- Hurricane Charley – The outerbands of Hurricane Charley brought light precipitation to most of coastal and central Georgia.
- Hurricane Frances – Frances dumped up to 5 inches (130 mm) of rain onto the state and caused the closings of schools in 56 counties. Across Georgia, winds of 30 to 40 miles per hour (48 to 64 km/h) and gusts to 50 miles per hour (80 km/h) led to the downing of tree branches and power lines, which left up to 380,000 residences without power. Significant crop damage occurred, particularly to the cotton and the peanut crops. On average, 30 percent of the crops were lost during Frances.
- Hurricane Ivan
- Hurricane Jeanne
- Tropical Storm Matthew (2004) – The remnants of Tropical Storm Matthew brought light rainfall to northern Georgia.
- Tropical Storm Arlene (2005) – Tropical Storm Arlene brought rainfall to much of the state, causing localized flooding. In Towns County, multiple residents were forced evacuate due to overflowing creeks and rivers in the northern portion of Georgia.

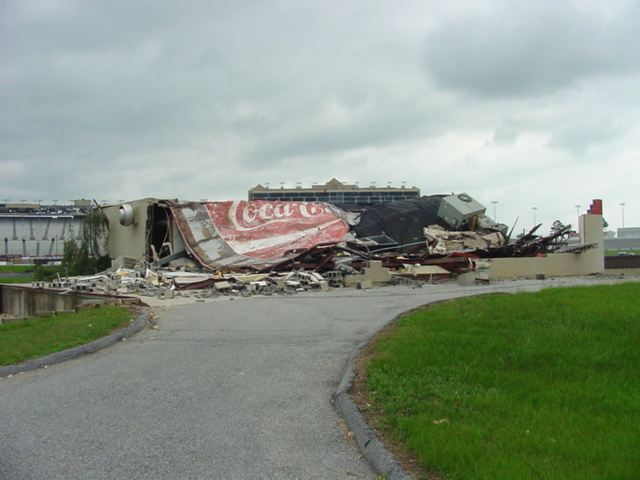
A tornado spawned by Hurricane Cindy damaged the Atlanta Motor Speedway

- Hurricane Cindy spawned a tornado in Hampton, causing damage to Atlanta Motor Speedway and Tara Field. A tornado in Fayette County damaged three homes and caused about $3 million in losses. Four other tornadoes were confirmed across the state. Hartsfield–Jackson Atlanta International Airport in Atlanta recorded over 5 inches (130 mm) of rain on July 6, its sixth-highest one-day rainfall since records began in 1878. This is more rain than the area normally gets in all of July.
- Hurricane Dennis – The outerbands of Hurricane Dennis caused local flooding the Atlanta area. One fatality occurred when a man was struck by a falling tree.
- Hurricane Katrina – Hurricane Katrina brought heavy rains and strong winds to northern and central Georgia. At least 18 tornadoes formed in Georgia on August 29, the most on record in that state for one day in August. The most serious of these tornadoes was an F2 tornado which affected Heard County and Carroll County. This tornado caused 3 injuries and one fatality and damaged several houses. In addition this tornado destroyed several poultry barns, killing over 140,000 chicks. The other tornadoes caused significant damages to buildings and agricultural facilities. In addition to the fatality caused by the F2 tornado, there was another fatality in a traffic accident.
- Hurricane Ophelia (2005) – Hurricane Ophelia brought light rainfall and storm surge to coastal Georgia.
- Hurricane Rita – Hurricane Rita produced up to 3 inches (76 mm) of precipitation in southern Georgia.
- Tropical Storm Tammy (2005) – Up to 14.48 inches (368 mm) of rainfall in Darien caused flooding in coastal Georgia. Several dirt and coastal roads were washed out. In Brunswick, 30 homes were damaged by flooding. A tornado in the area snapped trees and caused moderate roof damage.
- Hurricane Wilma – The outerbands of Hurricane Wilma brought light rainfall to southern and coastal Georgia.
- Tropical Storm Alberto (2006) – As Tropical Storm Alberto moved through Georgia, moderate winds of up to 45 mph (70 km/h) occurred along the coastline. Rainfall ranged from 3–5 inches (75–125 mm) across the southeast portion of the state, with a peak of 7.05 inches (179 mm) in Rincon. Alberto produced a storm tide of 8.53 feet (2.6 m) at Fort Pulaski National Monument, causing some beach erosion.
- Hurricane Ernesto (2006) – The outerbands of Hurricane Ernesto produced light rains and gusty winds in coastal Georgia.
- Tropical Storm Barry (2007)
- Hurricane Humberto (2007)
- Tropical Depression Ten (2007)
- Tropical Storm Cristobal (2008)
- Tropical Storm Fay (2008)
- Hurricane Ike
- Tropical Storm Claudette (2009)
- Hurricane Ida (2009)

=== 2010–2019 ===
- Tropical Depression Five (2010)
- Hurricane Earl (2010)
- Hurricane Irene
- Tropical Storm Lee (2011)
- May 22, 2012 – Light winds associated with Tropical Storm Alberto were observed at the Malcolm McKinnon Airport on St. Simons Island.
- May 26–29, 2012 – Hours before Tropical Storm Beryl moved ashore on May 27, officials in Cumberland Island, Georgia mandated that all campers evacuate the island. Storm surge flooded portions of St. Marys. Rainfall in the state peaked at 7.04 in (179 mm) at Woodbine. Beryl's rainfall was beneficial in alleviating drought conditions, despite causing some minor flooding. Wind gusts along the Georgia coastline peaked at 55 mph (90 km/h) at Jekyll Island, and sustained tropical force winds extended into the state. Downed trees damaged two homes in McIntosh County,
- June 25–27, 2012 – Heavy rainfall from Tropical Storm Debby extended northward into southern Georgia, peaking at 12.7 inches (320 mm) in Fargo. Localized and isolated flooding occurred in nearby Lowndes County.
- August 28–30, 2012 – The outer bands of Hurricane Isaac dropped light rainfall, peaking at 5.6 inches (140 mm) near Guyton.
- October 27–28, 2012 – Hurricane Sandy passed well offshore, though a few locations observed tropical storm force winds, especially near the Georgia-South Carolina state line. In Fort Pulaski, gusts reached 40 mph (64 km/h). At the same location, storm surge peaked at 2.89 feet (0.88 m), while tides in the rest of the state were 1 to 2 feet (0.30 to 0.61 m) above normal.
- Tropical Storm Andrea (2013)
- Hurricane Arthur (2014)
- Tropical Storm Ana (2015)
- Tropical Storm Bonnie (2016)
- Tropical Storm Colin (2016)
- Hurricane Hermine (2016)
- Tropical Storm Julia (2016)
- Hurricane Matthew (2016)
- Tropical Storm Cindy (2017)
- Hurricane Harvey (2017)
- Hurricane Irma (2017)
- Hurricane Nate (2017)
- Tropical Storm Alberto (2018)
- Hurricane Florence (2018)
- Tropical Storm Gordon (2018)
- Hurricane Michael (2018) – After making landfall in Florida as a category 5 hurricane, Hurricane Michael entered the state as a category 2, with wind gusts as high as 115 mph (185 km/h) being recorded near Donalsonville. In Seminole County, damage was reported to 99% of homes along with damage to timber and agriculture. Hurricane force wind gusts were reported as far inland as Albany. 3 tornadoes were also recorded in the state in association with Michael. One person in the state was killed state due to a fallen tree, and damage throughout the state was estimated at $4.7 billion.
- Hurricane Barry (2019)
- Hurricane Dorian (2019)
- Tropical Storm Nestor (2019)
- Tropical Storm Olga (2019)

=== 2020–present ===
- Tropical Storm Fay (2020)
- Hurricane Marco (2020)
- Hurricane Sally (2020)
- Tropical Storm Beta (2020)
- Hurricane Delta (2020)
- Hurricane Zeta (2020)
- Hurricane Eta (2020)
- Tropical Storm Claudette (2021)
- Tropical Storm Danny (2021)
- Hurricane Elsa (2021)
- Tropical Storm Fred (2021)
- Tropical Storm Mindy (2021)
- Tropical Storm Alex (2022) – It brought light rainfall to the state.
- Hurricane Idalia (2023) - After making landfall in Florida as a category 3, Idalia entered Georgia as a category 1 hurricane. Storm surge along the Georgia coast was estimated to be 2-4 feet. 4 tornadoes were reported in the state. One person was killed from a falling tree during cleanup after the storm.
- Hurricane Debby (2024) – It brought torrential rainfall across the Southeastern US counting Georgia as it trekked through the state as a weakening tropical storm, with up to 25 inches of rainfall forecasted in the state.
- Hurricane Helene (2024) – After making landfall in Florida as a category 4, Helene entered Georgia as a strong category 2 hurricane. Helene caused extensive damage from high winds and flooding rain. The storm brought extreme winds to portions of southern Georgia. In Valdosta, at least 115 buildings were seriously damaged. Further north, tree damage near Augusta was consistent with wind gusts of at least 100 mph. Rainfall totals exceeded 12 inches in parts of the state. Damages to agriculture alone were estimated to be more than $6 billion, and 37 people were killed throughout the state.
- Tropical Storm Arthur (2026) - The renmants of Arthur trigger ten tornadoes across Georgia.

== Effects ==
Name	Saffir–Simpson Category	Date of closest approach	Year
Unnamed	Category 1 hurricane (Note: Hurricane conditions in this state were limited to inland areas.)	August 24	1851
Unnamed	Category 1 hurricane	October 10	1852
Unnamed	Category 1 hurricane	October 21	1853
"Great Carolina"	Category 3 hurricane	September 8	1854
Unnamed	Category 1 hurricane	August 31	1856
Unnamed	Category 1 hurricane	October 3	1877
Unnamed	Category 1 hurricane	September 11	1878
Unnamed	Category 2 hurricane	August 28	1881
Unnamed	Category 1 hurricane	August 25	1885
Unnamed	Category 1 hurricane	June 21	1886
Unnamed	Category 1 hurricane	June 30	1886
"Sea Islands"	Category 3 hurricane	August 28	1893
Unnamed	Category 1 hurricane	October 9	1894
Unnamed	Category 2 hurricane	September 29	1896
Unnamed	Category 1 hurricane	August 31	1898
Unnamed	Category 4 hurricane	October 2	1898
Unnamed	Category 1 hurricane	August 28	1911
"Okeechobee"	Category 1 hurricane	September 18	1928
"Labor Day"	Category 1 hurricane	September 5	1935
Unnamed	Category 1 hurricane	August 11	1940
Unnamed	Category 1 hurricane	October 7	1941
Unnamed	Category 2 hurricane	October 15	1947
Unnamed	Category 1 hurricane	August 27	1949
David	Category 2 hurricane	September 4	1979
Kate	Category 1 hurricane	November 22	1985
Matthew	Category 1 hurricane (Note: This hurricane did not make landfall, but produced hurricane conditions over the state indicated.)	October 8	2016
Michael	Category 2 hurricane	October 10	2018
Idalia	Category 1 hurricane	August 30	2023
Helene	Category 2 hurricane	September 27	2024
Sources: Chronological List of All Hurricanes which Affected the Continental United States: 1851–2012; Documentation of Atlantic Tropical Cyclones Changes in HURDAT
