= 1898 Atlantic hurricane season =

- Season summary map

Seasonal boundaries
- First system formed: August 2, 1898
- Last system dissipated: November 4, 1898

Strongest storm
- Name: "Georgia"
  - Maximum winds: 130 mph (215 km/h) (1-minute sustained)
  - Lowest pressure: 938 mbar (hPa; 27.7 inHg)

Seasonal statistics
- Total storms: 11
- Hurricanes: 5
- Major hurricanes (Cat. 3+): 1
- Total fatalities: ≥486 total
- Total damage: > $4.4 million (1898 USD)

Related article
- 1890s North Indian Ocean cyclone seasons

The 1898 Atlantic hurricane season marked the beginning of the Weather Bureau operating a network of observation posts across the Caribbean Sea to track tropical cyclones, established primarily due to the onset of the Spanish–American War. A total of eleven tropical storms formed, five of which intensified into a hurricane, according to HURDAT, the National Hurricane Center's official database. Further, one cyclone strengthened into a major hurricane. (Note: A major hurricane is a storm that ranks as Category 3 or higher on the Saffir–Simpson hurricane wind scale.) However, in the absence of modern satellite and other remote-sensing technologies, only storms that affected populated land areas or encountered ships at sea were recorded, so the actual total could be higher. An undercount bias of zero to six tropical cyclones per year between 1851 and 1885 and zero to four per year between 1886 and 1910 has been estimated. The first system was initially observed on August 2 near West End in the Bahamas, while the eleventh and final storm dissipated on November 4 over the Mexican state of Veracruz.

Originally, only nine storms were recognized during the 1898 season, until reanalysis by meteorologists José Fernández-Partagás and Henry F. Diaz in 1996 led to the inclusion of the third and tenth systems. The Atlantic hurricane reanalysis project implemented few significant changes while reviewing the season in 2011, declining to add or remove storms from HURDAT. However, a study by climate researcher Michael Chenoweth, published in 2014, lists twelve tropical cyclones, proposing the removal of both systems first documented by Fernández-Partagás and Diaz and the eighth storm, as well as the addition of four new storms. However, Chenoweth's reanalysis has yet to be added to HURDAT.

The most intense tropical cyclone of the season, the seventh system, peaked as a Category 4 hurricane on the present-day Saffir–Simpson scale with maximum sustained winds of 130 mph (215 km/h). On October 2, the hurricane struck Georgia, causing 179 fatalities in the state and about $1.5 million (1898 USD) in damage there and in Florida combined. (Note: All damage figures are in 1898 USD, unless otherwise noted) Another devastating storm was the fourth cyclone, which left at least 283 deaths, including 200 or more on Saint Vincent, and approximately $2.5 million in property damage alone on Barbados. In August, the first system caused some damage in the Tampa area and the Florida Panhandle, while 16 people were killed after vessels capsized in the Gulf of Mexico. Additionally, flooding in Cuba's defunct Santa Clara Province as a result of the ninth storm left eight people dead due to drowning. Several other systems impacted land, but generally to a minor extent. Overall, the tropical cyclones of the 1898 Atlantic hurricane season caused at least 486 deaths and more than $4.4 million in damage.

== Season summary ==
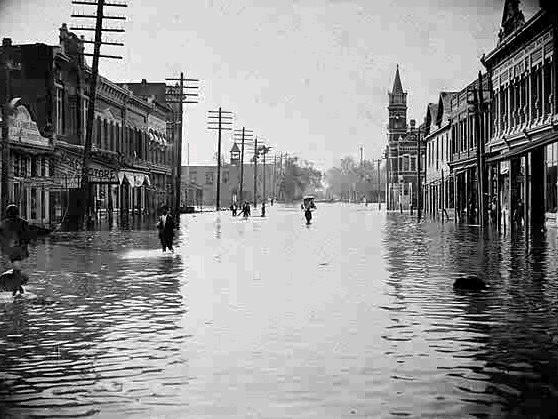
Storm surge flooding in Brunswick, Georgia, as a result of the seventh cyclone

The Atlantic hurricane database (HURDAT) officially recognizes that eleven tropical cyclones formed during the 1898 season, five of which strengthened into a hurricane, with one of those intensifying into a major hurricane. The Atlantic hurricane reanalysis project did not add or remove any storms from the 1996 reanalysis of the season by meteorologists José Fernández-Partagás and Henry F. Diaz. However, a more recent reanalysis by climate researcher Michael Chenoweth, published in 2014, adds four storms and removes three others—the third, eighth, and tenth systems—for a net gain of one cyclone, although these proposed changes have yet to be approved for inclusion to HURDAT.

The track for the first observed storm begins near Grand Bahama in the Bahamas on August 2. Moving west-northwestward to northwestward, the cyclone struck Florida twice before dissipating over Alabama on the following day. After four weeks of no activity, another system was detected on August 30 off the east coast of Florida. Striking South Carolina, the storm crossed into Georgia before also dissipating over Alabama on September 1. September became the most active month of the season, with six known systems developing. This included the seventh storm of the season, the strongest in the Atlantic in 1898, peaking as a Category 4 hurricane with winds of 130 mph (215 km/h) and a barometric pressure of 938 mbar (27.7 inHg). The storm also remains the most recent to make landfall in Georgia at major hurricane intensity. Three additional systems, all tropical storms, formed in October, with the third dissipating over Mexico by November 4. Overall, the cyclones of the 1898 season caused more than $4.4 million in damage and 486–637 deaths.

In April 1898, the United States declared war on Spain, marking the beginning of the Spanish–American War, after the USS Maine capsized in Havana Harbor on February 15. Due to the increased presence of American vessels in the Caribbean Sea as a result of the war, Weather Bureau head Willis L. Moore convinced President William McKinley to authorize the establishment of weather observation posts throughout the region. Following approval from President McKinley and Congress, the Weather Bureau quickly constructed five sites, with a central location at Kingston, Jamaica, and the others at Santiago de Cuba, Cuba; Willemstad, Curaçao; Santo Domingo, Dominican Republic; and Port of Spain, Trinidad and Tobago.

The season's activity was reflected with an accumulated cyclone energy (ACE) rating of 113. ACE is a metric used to express the energy used by a tropical cyclone during its lifetime. Therefore, a storm with a longer duration will have higher values of ACE. It is only calculated at six-hour increments in which specific tropical and subtropical systems are either at or above sustained wind speeds of 39 mph (63 km/h), which is the threshold for tropical storm intensity. Thus, tropical depressions are not included here.

== Systems ==
=== Hurricane One ===
- Category 1 hurricane (SSHWS)
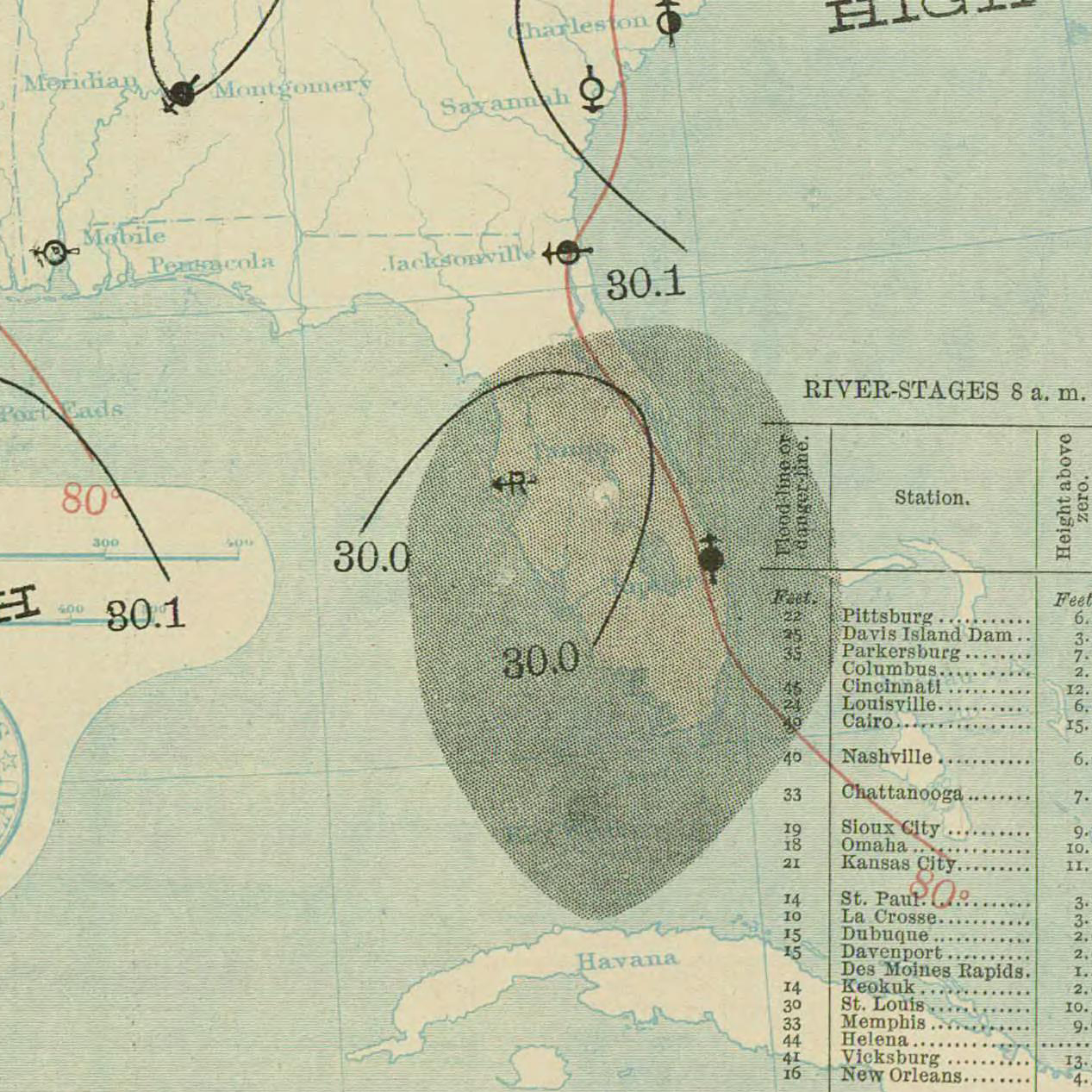
- Duration: August 2 – August 3
- Peak intensity: 80 mph (130 km/h) (1-min); 982 mbar (hPa)

According to the Weather Bureau, a "feeble disturbance" developed into a tropical storm near West End in the Bahamas early on August 2. Three hours later, the storm made landfall in Hobe Sound, Florida, with winds of 40 mph (65 km/h). The system briefly weakened to a tropical depression on August 2, before re-strengthening into a tropical storm and emerging into the Gulf of Mexico near Tarpon Springs. Later that day, the cyclone intensified quickly, becoming a Category 1 hurricane on the modern-day Saffir–Simpson hurricane wind scale at 23:00 UTC. Simultaneously, the hurricane made a second Florida landfall on St. George Island with winds of 80 mph (130 km/h), an intensity estimated mainly based on the severity of damage in the area. After moving inland, it rapidly weakened and dissipated over southwestern Alabama late on August 3.

During its first landfall, the storm churned up surf on the Lake Worth Lagoon, and generated strong winds that felled signage, fencing, and trees. At West Palm Beach winds unofficially "blew with hurricane velocity". About 24 hours of heavy rainfall was observed in the Tampa area, which the Morning Tribune noted caused "great damage ... in many places." In the Florida Panhandle, considerable impact was inflicted to crops, turpentine farms, and property. Offshore, three barges, four tugboats, and many sailing crafts sank. Among the capsized vessels was the tugboat Nimrod, with 12 people aboard, all of whom drowned. Four additional deaths occurred offshore, three after the Keyser wrecked and another one after the Herndon foundered.

Climate researcher Michael Chenoweth's reanalysis, published in 2014, suggests that the storm did not become a tropical storm until reaching the Gulf of Mexico, but did not propose any other significant changes.

=== Hurricane Two ===
- Category 1 hurricane (SSHWS)
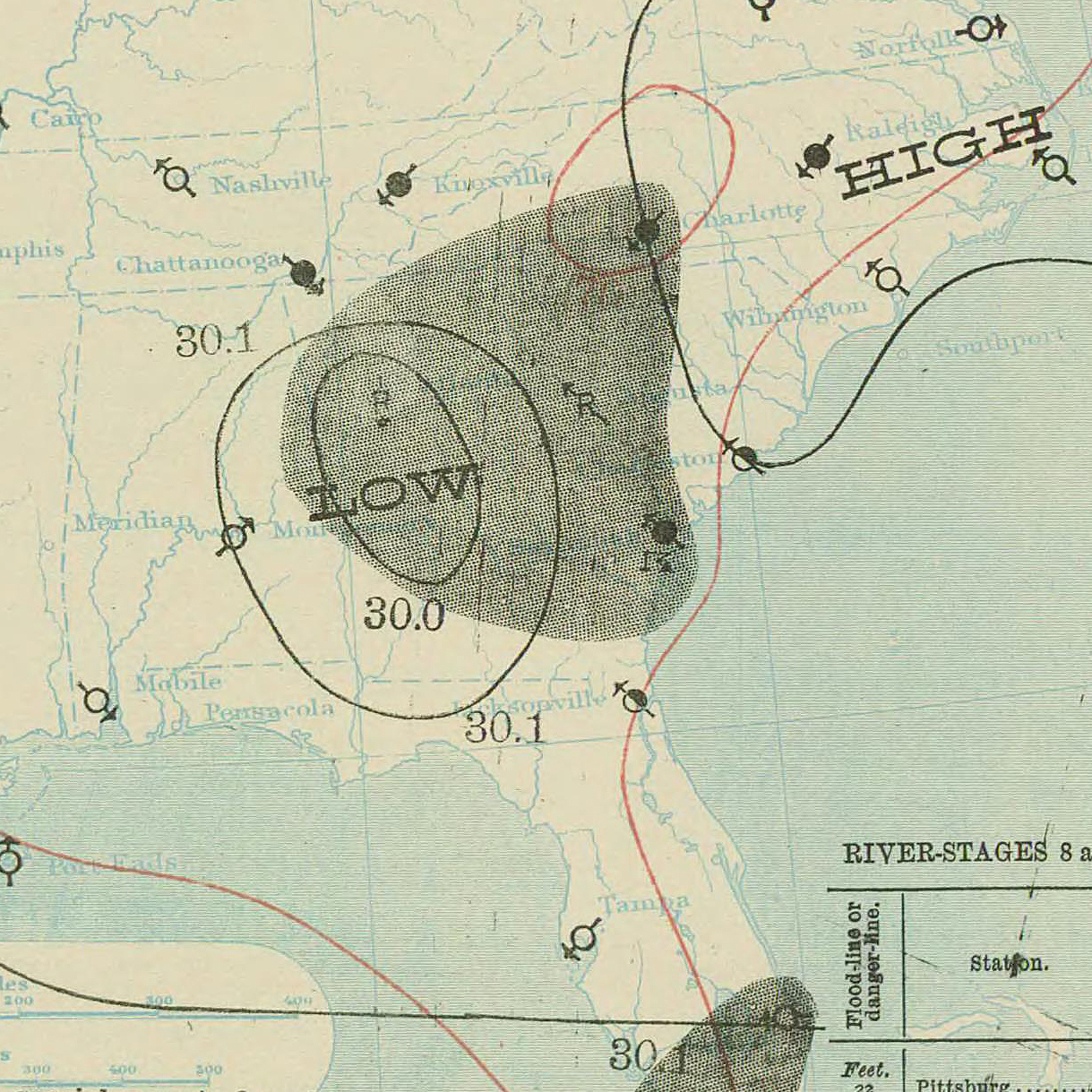
- Duration: August 30 – September 1
- Peak intensity: 85 mph (140 km/h) (1-min); 990 mbar (hPa)

The Weather Bureau noted that a "feeble disturbance" tracked eastward across the Gulf of Mexico and Florida between August 27 and August 29. After reaching a point about 100 mi (160 km) northeast of Cape Canaveral on August 30, the Weather Bureau reported that the disturbance had characteristics of a tropical cyclone. Moving northwestward, the storm soon strengthened into a hurricane and peaked with winds of 85 mph (140 km/h), based on Savannah, Georgia, recording a barometric pressure of 990 mbar (29 inHg). Around 07:00 UTC on August 31, the hurricane made landfall at the south end of Hilton Head Island, South Carolina. The cyclone weakened to a tropical storm about five hours later and then curved westward. Late on September 1, the storm weakened to a tropical depression and dissipated over Alabama.

Severe damage occurred near the storm's point of landfall, with sustained winds of 84 mph (135 km/h) at Tybee Island, Georgia. Approximately 100 buildings in the vicinity of Savannah at least partially lost their roof and many others experienced at least some degree of damage. The barks Noe and Ragna wrecked along the northeast coast of Georgia. At Port Royal, South Carolina, this storm produced 10.82 in (275 mm) of rain over a 24-hour period, breaking the previous one-day record by 5.89 in (150 mm), with a storm total of 12.4 in (310 mm). Overall, the storm caused approximately $400,000 in damage, nearly all in Savannah and at nearby rice plantations.

Chenoweth argued that this storm developed as a tropical depression on August 29 just north of the Abaco Islands in the Bahamas and weakened slower over the Southeastern United States, dissipating over Tennessee on September 2.

=== Hurricane Three ===
- Category 1 hurricane (SSHWS)
- Duration: September 3 – September 5
- Peak intensity: 80 mph (130 km/h) (1-min);

On September 3, the ship America first encountered this storm, a Category 1 hurricane about 675 mi (1,085 km) southeast of Cape Race, Newfoundland. The America, Ruthin, and Iddesleigh each recorded winds of 80 mph (130 km/h). Later, waves waterlogged the America and eventually caused it to capsize, but the Marengo rescued the crew. The storm moved northeastward and was last encountered by the brig Iddesleigh on September 5, on the same day the Atlantic hurricane best track indicated that the system transitioned into an extratropical cyclone approximately 870 mi (1,400 km) west-southwest of Ireland. The extratropical storm dissipated several hours later. A reanalysis by Chenoweth, published in 2014, argued that this system was not a tropical cyclone.

=== Hurricane Four ===
- Category 2 hurricane (SSHWS)
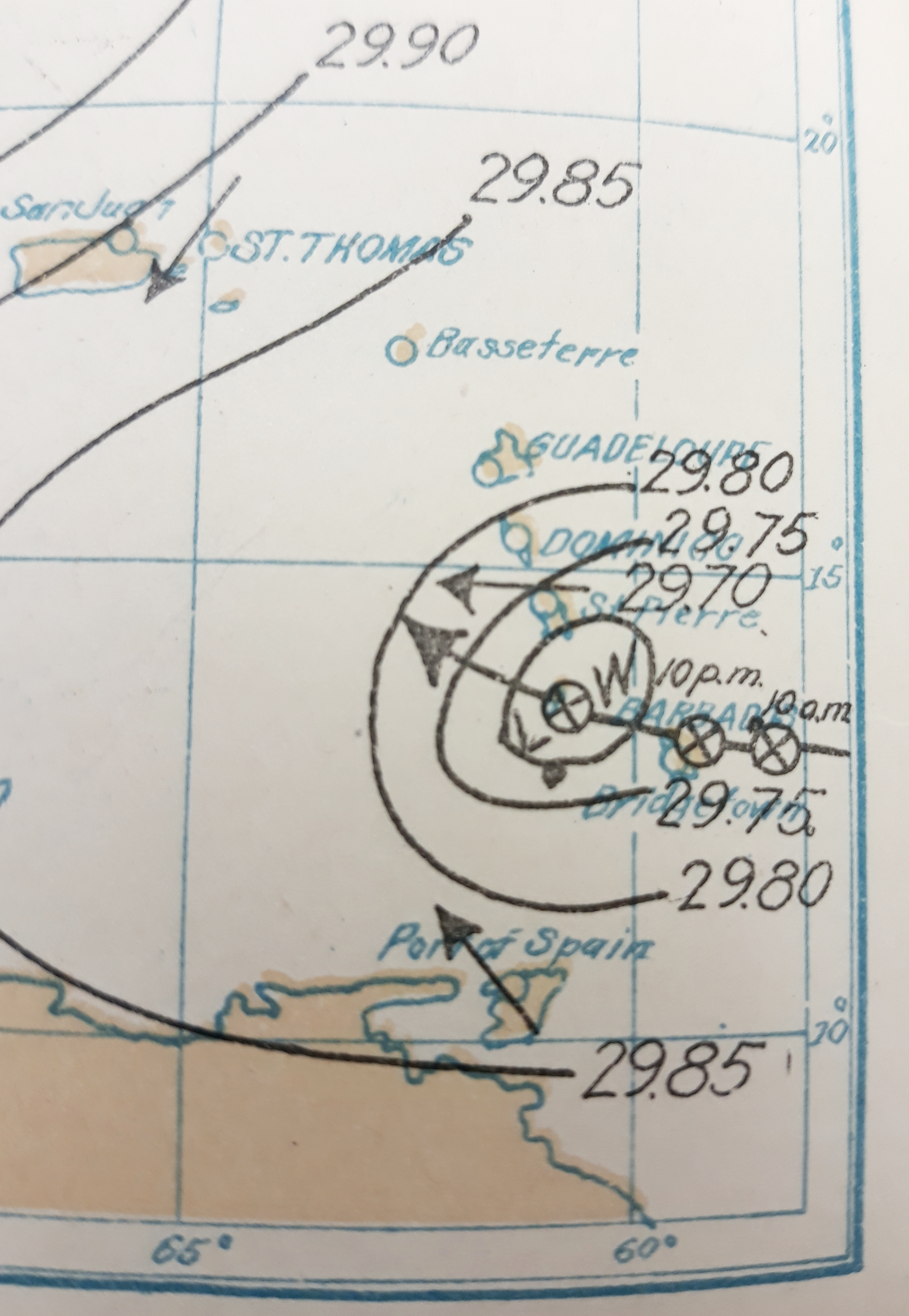
- Duration: September 5 – September 19
- Peak intensity: 110 mph (175 km/h) (1-min); 965 mbar (hPa)

Ships first indicated the presence of a tropical storm southwest of Cabo Verde on September 5. The system moved generally westward and intensified into a hurricane late the next day. Early on September 11, the storm peaked as a strong Category 2 hurricane with maximum sustained winds of 110 mph (175 km/h) as it began passing through the Lesser Antilles, first near Barbados and then between Saint Lucia and Saint Vincent several hours later. Thereafter, the hurricane turned northwestward and entered the Caribbean. Around 18:00 UTC on September 12, the cyclone passed just west of Anguilla while traversing the Anegada Passage and re-emerged into the Atlantic. The storm continued northwestward until curving northeastward on September 17. Late on September 19, the system transitioned into an extratropical cyclone about 95 mi (155 km) of the eastern tip of Nova Scotia. The remnants crossed Newfoundland before dissipating over the Labrador Sea on the following day.

Extensive impacts occurred in the Windward Islands. On Barbados, the storm rendered many streets impassable and substantially damaged two stone bridges. Winds downed many trees and thousands of telephone poles. Across the island, 5,062 homes were destroyed and another 2,359 suffered some degree of damage, rendering an estimated 40,000 people homeless. Property damage alone reached about $2.5 million. Saint Vincent also experienced significant impact, especially on the west side of the island. Windward Islands governor Cornelius Alfred Moloney noted that "From Buccamont to Kingstown ... everything is destroyed." A telegraph between British government officials stated that the storm destroyed 2,000 dwellings and damaged numerous others, leaving roughly 15,000 people homeless, though a report authored by T. A. Carpenter and published in the Quarterly Journal of the Royal Meteorological Society reported 6,000 homes demolished or damaged beyond repair and raised the number of persons rendered homeless to about 20,000. The National Hurricane Center estimated in 1996 that this hurricane caused 283 to 383 fatalities, with 200 and 300 fatalities on Saint Vincent and 83 deaths on Barbados. However, this excludes 18 deaths on Guadeloupe and another after a crew member of a ship was swept overboard over the open Atlantic. Additionally, the death toll for Barbados may have been 115, according to Carpenter.

According to Chenoweth's reanalysis study, this cyclone did not form until September 9. The storm also had two stints as a major hurricane, first while passing through the Lesser Antilles and later on September 18 and September 19, before dissipating east of Newfoundland on the next day; the storm peaked with winds of 120 mph (195 km/h) each time.

=== Tropical Storm Five ===
- Tropical storm (SSHWS)
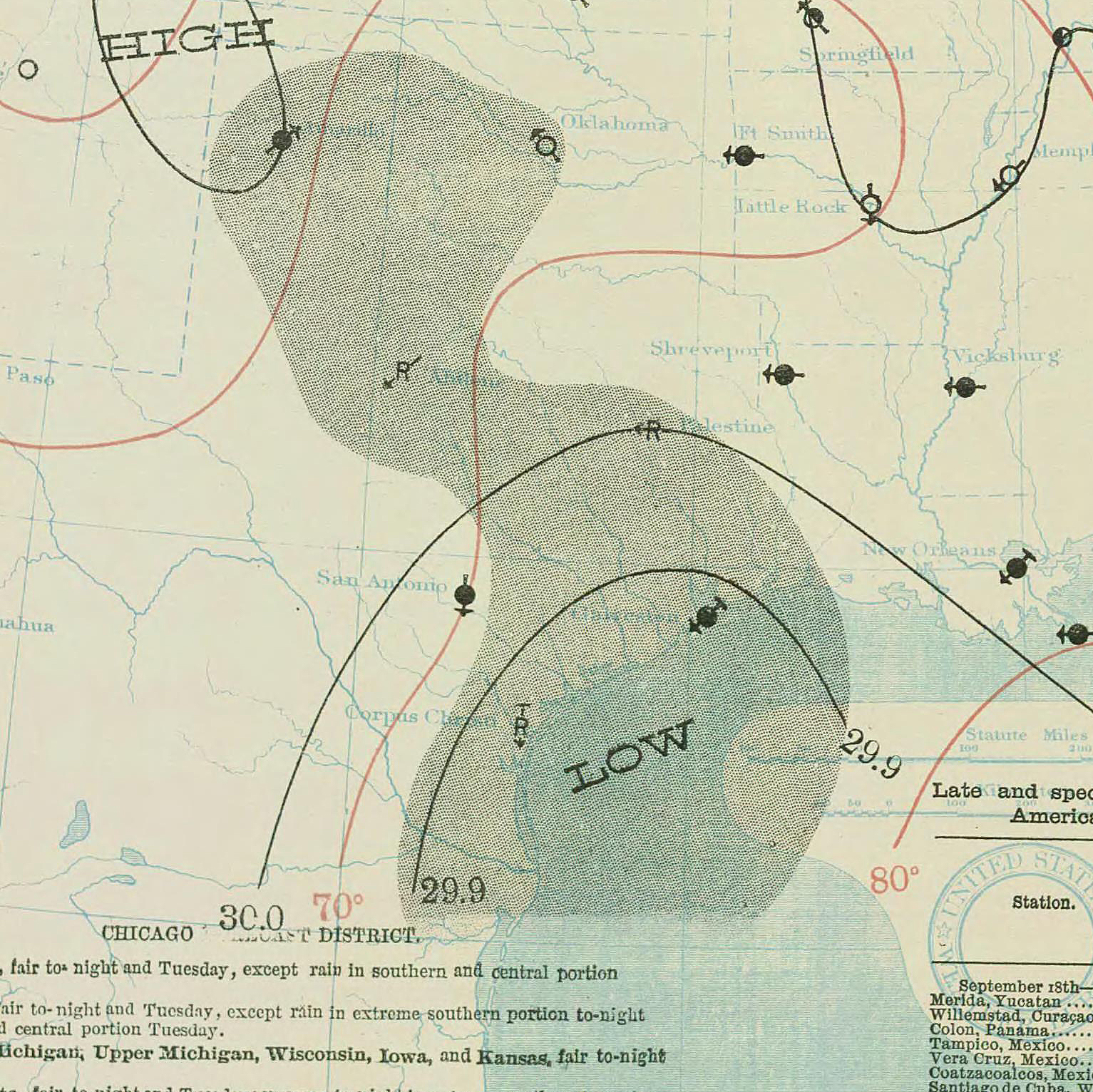
- Duration: September 12 – September 22
- Peak intensity: 60 mph (95 km/h) (1-min);

Although Fernández-Partagás and Diaz did not confirm information about this storm before September 18, they opted to retain the track back to September 12 for continuity with previous reanalyses. The storm initially moved slowly northwestward and turned west-northwestward on September 14. Two days later, the cyclone moved ashore northern Belize (then known as British Honduras) and crossed southeastern Mexico before emerging into the Gulf of Mexico near Ciudad del Carmen, Campeche, early on September 17. The storm then moved mostly northward for the next few days, until curving slightly to the north-northeast on September 19 while approaching the Gulf Coast of the United States. Around 11:00 UTC on September 20, the cyclone made landfall just east of Creole, Louisiana, with winds of 60 mph (95 km/h). The cyclone is estimated to have weakened to a tropical depression near the Arkansas-Louisiana state line on September 21 and then dissipated over Illinois on September 22.

Parts of Louisiana experienced heavy rainfall. Plaquemine reported 4 in (100 mm) of precipitation in only a few hours, damaging local sugarcane crops. In Lake Charles, rains flooded streets and caused losses to rice crops, while winds downed many telephone poles. Similarly, the town of Jennings noted damage to rice crops, with losses totaling "many thousands", according to The Times-Democrat. Farther east, New Orleans reported sustained winds up to 42 mph (68 km/h). Precipitation generated by the storm in Mississippi led to a washout along the Yazoo and Mississippi Valley Railroad. Elsewhere, winds and precipitation from the storm and its remnants spread across parts of the Mississippi Valley and Eastern United States.

Chenoweth does not begin the track for this storm until September 19, when it was centered over the west-central Gulf of Mexico. The system also moves more northeasterly over land and transitions into an extratropical cyclone on September 21.

=== Tropical Storm Six ===
- Tropical storm (SSHWS)
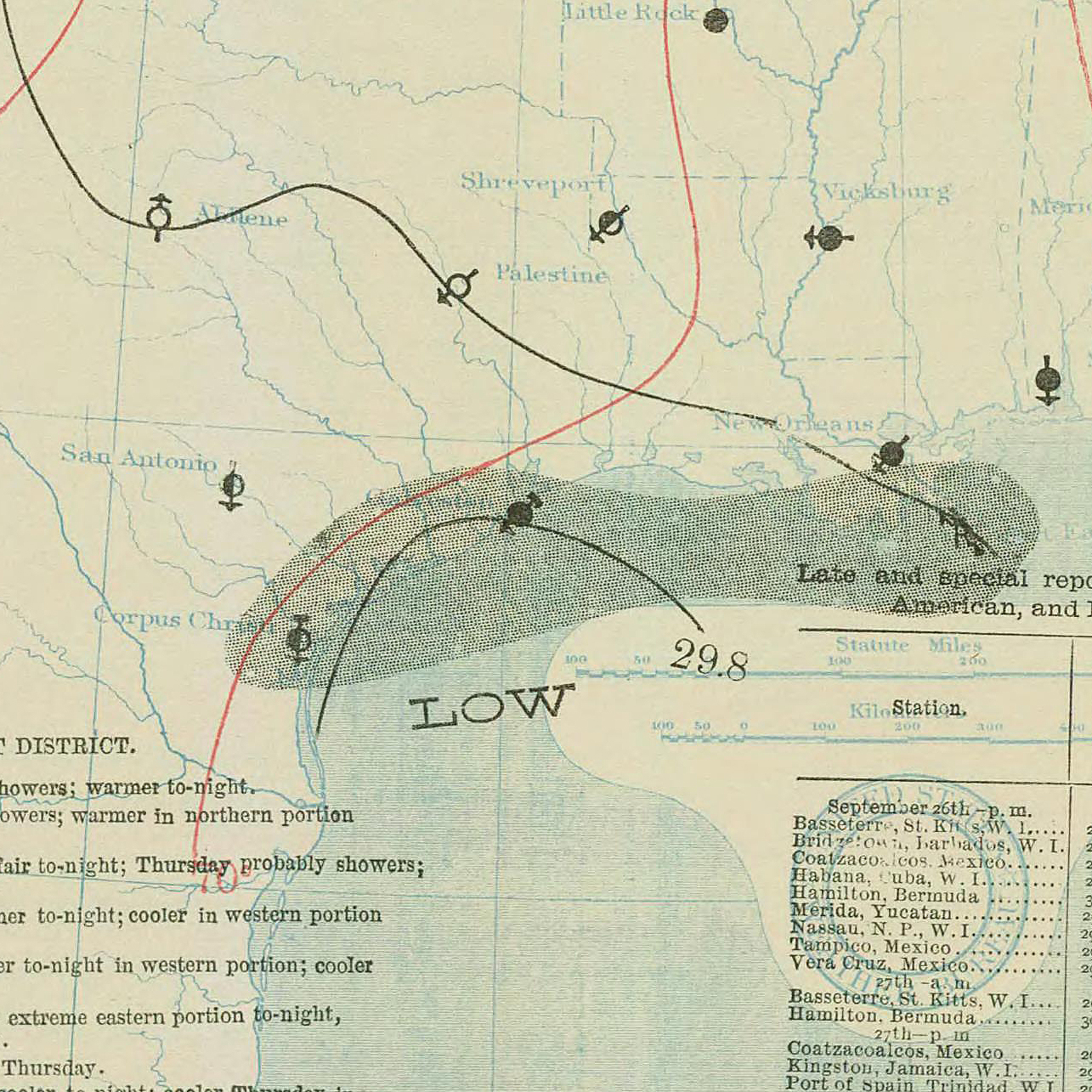
- Duration: September 20 – September 28
- Peak intensity: 60 mph (95 km/h) (1-min);

HURDAT begins the track of the sixth storm over the southwestern Caribbean on September 20. It followed a path similar to the fifth storm, tracking northwestward and hitting the Yucatán Peninsula near Playa del Carmen, Quintana Roo, on September 23 with 60 mph (95 km/h) winds. By September 26, the cyclone turned northward over the west-central Gulf of Mexico. Around 07:00 UTC on September 28, the storm made landfall in Texas near the west end of the Bolivar Peninsula. The system weakened to a tropical depression several hours after moving inland and promptly dissipated over Tyler County.

Heavy rainfall fell across the central Gulf coast and up the Mississippi Valley, with the highest totals recorded at Pensacola, Florida, with 12.61 in (320 mm) and Sikeston, Missouri, where 11.67 in (296 mm) fell. At the former, a Weather Bureau observer considered the 48-hour rainfall amount of 11.45 in (291 mm) to be unprecedent when compared to the then-19 years of records at that location. Some homes in Pensacola reported floodwaters reaching as high as 12 to 14 in (300 to 360 mm) above the floor. Nearby, the ship Bellevue capsized at a Perdido Key wharf. In Louisiana, precipitation generated by the storm flooded several streets in New Orleans.

Similar to the previous cyclone, the track for this storm is not started by Chenoweth until it is over the west-central Gulf of Mexico on September 27, but otherwise proposes only minor alterations to the system's path, duration, and intensity.

=== Hurricane Seven ===
- Category 4 hurricane (SSHWS)
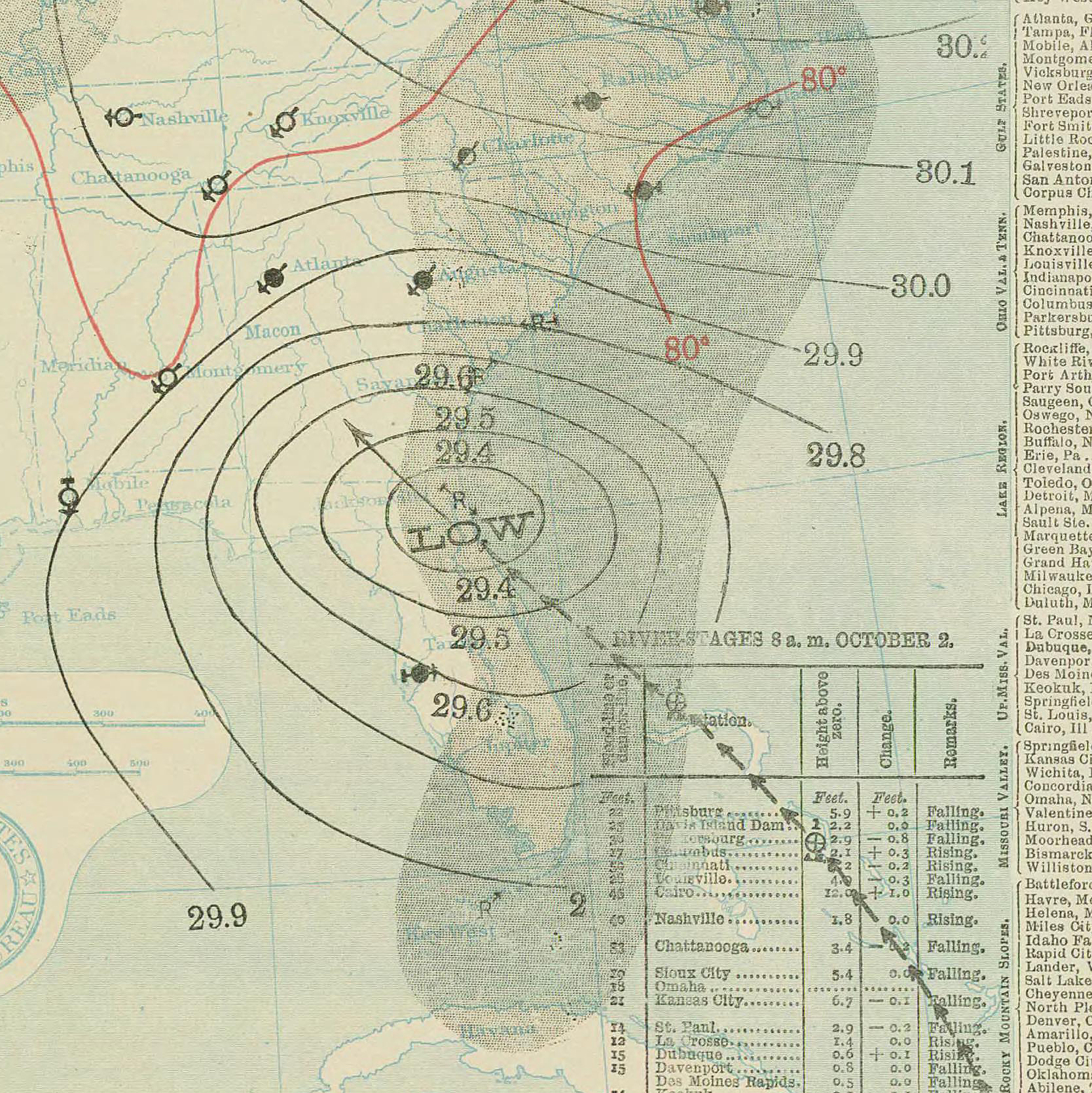
- Duration: September 25 – October 6
- Peak intensity: 130 mph (215 km/h) (1-min); 938 mbar (hPa)

Although the steamship Philadelphia first encountered this storm north of Puerto Rico on September 27, a 1993 reanalysis by meteorologist C. J. Neumann began the track for this system about 200 mi (320 km) east of Guadeloupe two days earlier. Traveling northwest, the storm intensified into a hurricane on September 26 and then into a Category 2 hurricane on September 27. While nearing the coast of the Southeastern United States, the cyclone became a Category 3 hurricane early on October 1 and then a Category 4 hurricane the next day. Around 12:00 UTC on October 2, the storm peaked with maximum sustained winds of 130 mph (215 km/h) and a minimum barometric pressure of 938 mbar (27.7 inHg). The hurricane then made landfall on Cumberland Island, Georgia, four hours later at the same intensity. Early on October 3, the system weakened to a tropical storm over west-central Georgia and a tropical depression over northeastern Alabama several hours later. The cyclone turned northeastward over Indiana and then east-northeastward over Ontario. After emerging into the Gulf of St. Lawrence, the storm struck Newfoundland on October 6 and promptly dissipated.

The First Coast of Florida experienced strong winds and storm surge. Though only minor impacts occurred in Jacksonville, the city lost communications with areas farther north. Nearby, Jacksonville Beach (then known as Pablo Beach) and Mayport reported damage due to storm surge. Farther north, storm surge may have reached 12 ft (3.7 m) in height in Fernandina Beach, flooding much of the town. Damage in Florida was conservatively estimated at $500,000. In Georgia, the storm produced tides up to 18 ft (5.5 m) above mean high water mark at the Sapelo Island Lighthouse. A total of 32 people died in Darien. Storm surge inundated much of Brunswick, with at least 20 streets flooded with 4 to 8 ft (1.2 to 2.4 m) of water, damaging nearly all businesses, warehouses, and docks. Tides and storm surge also caused flooding in the Savannah area, drowning 97 people at one plantation and numerous livestock while ruining about 5,000 barrels of rosin and 60,000 bushels of rice. High tides caused some damage to rice and cotton crops in South Carolina. The cyclone produced heavy rainfall in other areas of the Southeastern United States, especially in western North Carolina. Overall, the storm caused significant damage amounting to around $1.5 million, and 179 fatalities in Georgia.

Chenoweth's reanalysis initiates the track for this storm north of Puerto Rico on September 21. The storm had two stints as a major hurricane, the first from September 25 to September 28, with the cyclone peaking with winds of 145 mph (230 km/h) on September 27. Additionally, Chenoweth argued that the system passed over portions of the eastern Bahamas while at peak intensity, and later transitioned into an extratropical cyclone over Lake Erie on October 5.

=== Tropical Storm Eight ===
- Tropical storm (SSHWS)
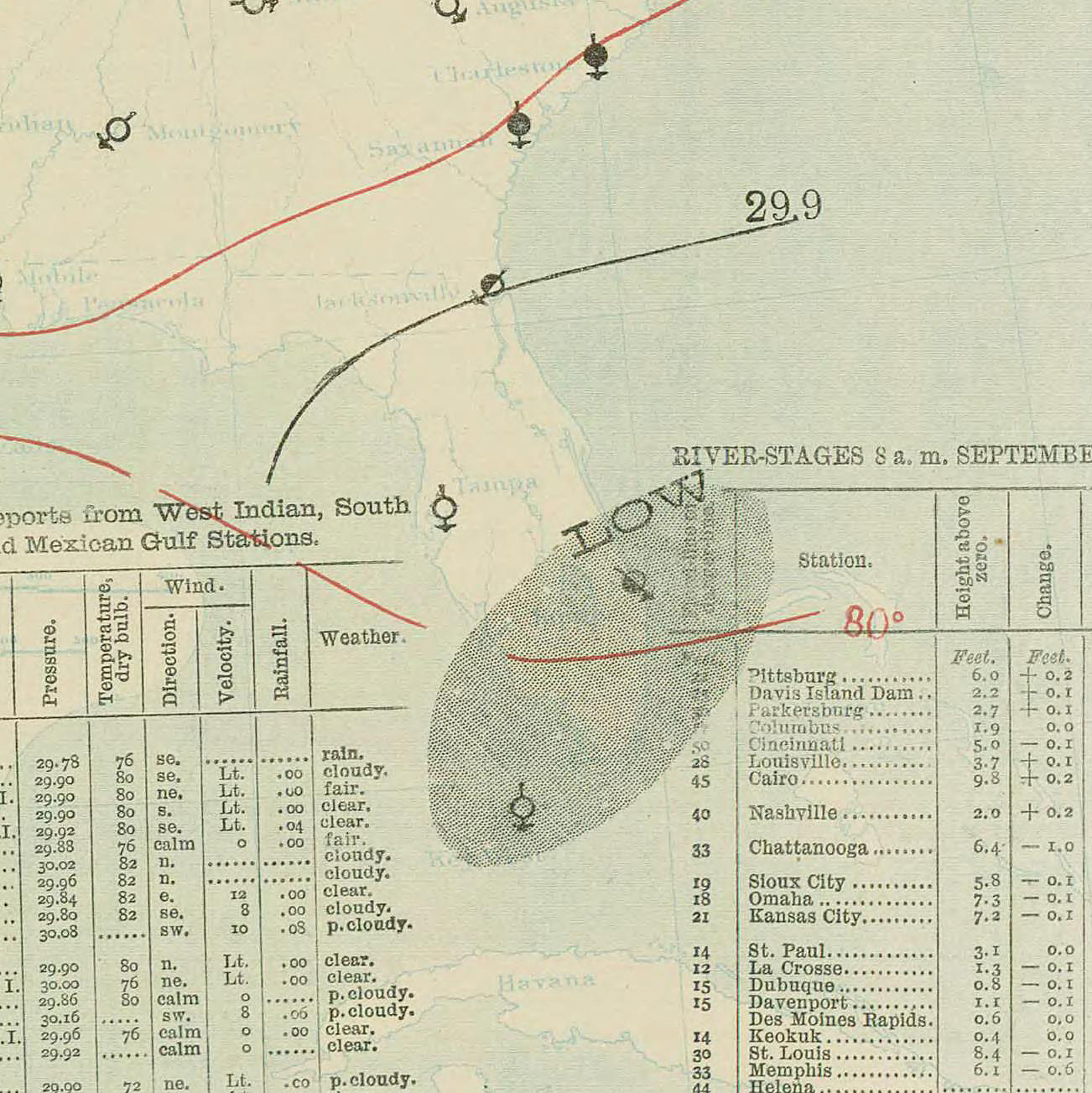
- Duration: September 25 – September 28
- Peak intensity: 50 mph (85 km/h) (1-min); 1008 mbar (hPa)

A tropical depression formed over the northwestern Caribbean on September 25. Moving northeastward, the depression brushed Cuba's Isla de la Juventud on the following day and then made landfall on the main island along the north shore of the Gulf of Batabanó. Havana observed a barometric pressure of 1,008 mbar (29.8 inHg), the lowest in relation to the storm. Thereafter, the cyclone emerged into the Straits of Florida late on September 26 and then intensified into a tropical storm early the next day. Throughout September 27, the system crossed the northwestern Bahamas, including striking the Abaco Islands with winds of 50 mph (85 km/h). After exiting the Bahamas on September 28, the cyclone weakened, possibly due to the approach of the previous storm, and was last noted several hours later.

According to the Monthly Weather Review, the system "caused considerable damage on some of the islands" in the Bahamas. The settlement of Current on North Eleuthera reported damage to boats, houses, and orange crops. In the Cherokee Sound district of Great Abaco Island, the storm destroyed 39 dwellings and damaged many other structures. According to Chenoweth, however, damage ascribed to this storm in the Bahamas was actually related to the previous hurricane, which he places near Eleuthera and Great Abaco Island during this timeframe as a Category 4 hurricane.

=== Tropical Storm Nine ===
- Tropical storm (SSHWS)
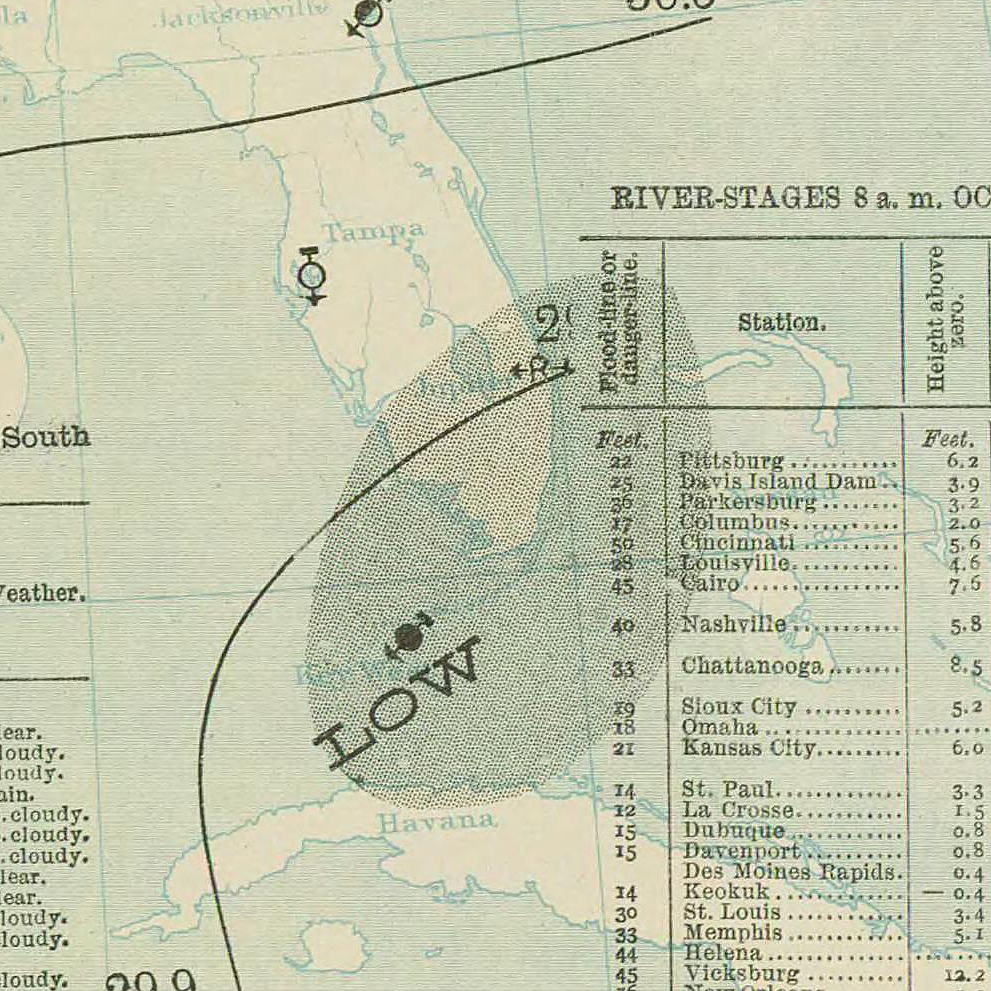
- Duration: October 2 – October 14
- Peak intensity: 70 mph (110 km/h) (1-min);

Fernández-Partagás and Diaz expressed "some skepticism about the exist of the storm" prior to October 7, but nonetheless accepted previous versions of the track of this storm showing development just east of the Windward Islands on October 2. The tropical storm moved west-northwestward and passed near or over Bequia, an island of the modern-day Saint Vincent and the Grenadines, while entering the Caribbean on the next day. Continuing west-northwestward to northwestward for several days, the cyclone passed just west of Jamaica on October 8 and then turned in a more northerly direction on October 9. By the next day, the storm struck Cuba along the north shore of the Gulf of Batabanó near the same location as the previous storm. Curving northeastward and reaching the Straits of Florida early on October 11, the system nearly reached hurricane status that day, peaking with winds of 70 mph (110 km/h). The storm then traversed the far western Bahamas, brushing or striking Bimini and Grand Bahama. Late on October 14, the cyclone was last noted about 375 mi (605 km) northeast of Bermuda.

Santa Clara Province, Cuba, reported severe flooding. A telegraph from the town of Trinidad noted that "a great many houses were swept away entirely." Winds caused telephone and electrical wires to come in contract with each other, igniting a fire that destroyed a telephone station. Eight people in the area drowned, along with numerous cattle. In Florida, squalls and rough seas impacted at least the vicinity of Miami. Two people went missing from Lemon City (now the Miami neighborhood of Little Haiti) after their boat sank in a 12 ft (3.7 m) wave, but were later rescued.

Chenoweth does not begin the track for this storm until it was over the western Caribbean on October 9. Additionally, Chenoweth ends the track on October 12, two days before HURDAT.

=== Tropical Storm Ten ===
- Tropical storm (SSHWS)
- Duration: October 21 – October 23
- Peak intensity: 45 mph (75 km/h) (1-min);

A tropical storm, located over the northwestern Caribbean, began impacting Cuba on October 21. The cyclone moved northeastward and made landfall near Guanimar in present-day Artemisa Province late on the next day with winds of 45 mph (75 km/h). Flooding occurred, especially in Pinar del Río and Santa Clara provinces. Several vessels capsized, including the schooner Kate, a Red Cross-owned ship loaded with medical and store supplies for General José Miguel Gómez's forces, who were fighting in the Cuban War of Independence. The crew survived, but the cargo could not be salvaged. Emerging into the Straits of Florida early on October 23, the storm transitioned into an extratropical cyclone several hours later just west of Andros in the Bahamas due to an approaching frontal boundary. The remnants became indistinguishable near the Abaco Islands shortly thereafter.

Chenoweth does not consider this system to have been a cyclone, arguing that "Daily weather maps and ship reports do not provide evidence for a tropical cyclone".

=== Tropical Storm Eleven ===
- Tropical storm (SSHWS)
- Duration: October 27 – November 4
- Peak intensity: 60 mph (95 km/h) (1-min);

A tropical storm with winds of 60 mph (95 km/h) was first observed near Barbuda early on October 27. The storm moved almost due west, passing through the northern Leeward Islands and then just south of Puerto Rico, Hispaniola, and Jamaica before making landfall at Ambergris Caye, British Honduras, with winds of 50 mph (85 km/h) on November 3. The system weakened as it continued westward over Mexico and dissipated on the following day near Coatzacoalcos, Veracruz. Fernández-Partagás and Diaz noted that "Very little information was found about this storm" and expressed "skepticism regarding the existence and evolution of this storm". Chenoweth suggests that the system dissipated a day previous to that listed officially and meandered parabolically over the western Caribbean Sea, becoming a moderate hurricane that peaked with winds of 100 mph (155 km/h) on October 31 and later struck Honduras as a strong tropical storm.

=== Other storms ===
Chenoweth's 2014 study proposed four cyclones not currently included in HURDAT. The first such storm originated from a previously extratropical storm to the southeast of Bermuda on March 13. A subtropical storm, it moved northeastward through March 15, by which time it turned to the southeast. The storm transitioned into an extratropical cyclone early on the following day. If the existence of this system is confirmed, it would become one of only two known Atlantic tropical or subtropical storms in the month of March, the other occurring in 1908. On September 2, the next unofficial system formed over the southwestern Caribbean. The storm moved northwestward and attained hurricane status within 24 hours. It then turned west-northwestward and struck Belize (then known as British Honduras) late on September 4, before reaching the Gulf of Mexico the next day. The storm moved northwestward to north-northwestward and appeared to threaten Texas before curving east-northeastward on September 8. The cyclone then curved northwestward on September 10, two days before making landfall near Abbeville, Louisiana, and quickly dissipating. Chenoweth theorized that a tropical depression developed near the Cabo Verde Islands on September 29. The cyclone strengthened into a tropical storm on the next day and moved parabolically across the eastern Atlantic until dissipating south of the Azores on October 8. The final unofficial system formed well east of Bermuda on November 8. Initially a tropical depression, it became a subtropical storm but then a fully tropical storm late the following day while moving slowly northwestward. The storm then executed a small cyclonic loop before becoming extratropical late on November 14.

== Season effects ==
This is a table of all of the known storms that have formed in the 1898 Atlantic hurricane season. It includes their duration, landfall, damages, and death totals. Deaths in parentheses are additional and indirect (an example of an indirect death would be a traffic accident), but were still related to that storm. Damage and deaths include totals while the storm was extratropical, a wave, or a low, and all of the damage figures are in 1898 USD.

Saffir–Simpson scale
TD	TS	C1	C2	C3	C4	C5

1898 North Atlantic tropical cyclone season statistics
Storm name	Dates active	Storm category at peak intensity	Max 1-min wind mph (km/h)	Min. press. (mbar)	Areas affected	Damage (US$)	Deaths	Ref(s).
One	August 2–3	Category 1 hurricane	80 (130)	982	Southeastern United States (Florida)	Unknown	16	
Two	August 30 – September 1	Category 1 hurricane	85 (135)	990	Southeastern United States (South Carolina)	$400,000	None	
Three	September 3–5	Category 1 hurricane	80 (130)	Unknown	None	None	None	
Four	September 5–19	Category 2 hurricane	110 (175)	965	Lesser Antilles (Saint Vincent)	>$2.5 million	283–434	
Five	September 12–22	Tropical storm	60 (95)	Unknown	British Honduras, Mexico, Gulf Coast of the United States (Louisiana)	Unknown	None	
Six	September 20–28	Tropical storm	60 (95)	Unknown	Mexico, Gulf Coast of the United States (Texas), Mississippi River valley	Unknown	None	
Seven	September 25 – October 6	Category 4 hurricane	130 (215)	938	Southeastern United States (Georgia)	$1.5 million	179	
Eight	September 25–28	Tropical storm	50 (85)	1008	Cuba (La Habana Province), the Bahamas (Abaco Islands)	Unknown	None	
Nine	October 2–14	Tropical storm	70 (110)	Unknown	Cuba (La Habana Province), Florida, the Bahamas (Grand Bahama)	Unknown	8	
Ten	October 24–28	Tropical storm	45 (75)	Unknown	Cuba (Artemisa Province), the Bahamas	Unknown	None	
Eleven	October 27 – November 4	Tropical storm	60 (95)	Unknown	Lesser Antilles, Greater Antilles, British Honduras, Mexico	Unknown	None	
Season aggregates
11 systems	August 2 – November 4		145 (230)	938		>$4.4 million	486–637	

== See also ==
- List of Florida hurricanes (pre-1900)
- List of Georgia hurricanes
- Tropical cyclone observation
