= Guanimar =

Town in Western Cuba

Coordinates: 22°41′18″N 82°39′17″W

Guanimar is a small town in Artemisa Province, along the southern coast of western Cuba.

== History ==
Guanimar was affected in the 1898 Atlantic hurricane season. The town was hit by Hurricane Rita in 2005. The town was heavily flooded during Hurricane Idalia in 2023.

== See also ==
- List of places in Cuba
