= 1831 Barbados–Louisiana hurricane =

Category 4 Atlantic hurricane in 1831

Meteorological history
- Formed: before August 10, 1831
- Dissipated: after August 17, 1831

Category 4 major hurricane
- 1-minute sustained (SSHWS/NWS)
- Highest winds: 130 mph (215 km/h)

Overall effects
- Fatalities: c. 2,500
- Damage: $7 million (1831 USD)
- Areas affected: Barbados, Puerto Rico, Cuba, Louisiana
- Part of the 1831 Atlantic hurricane season

The Great Barbados hurricane was an intense Category 4 hurricane that left cataclysmic damage across the Caribbean and Louisiana in 1831.

== Meteorological history ==
The storm came toward the end of an active summer storm season. In June of 1831, Captain Charles Cooper from the mail-boat schooner Friends took note of a strong gale about 15 miles south of Grenada, more severe than any storm since 1780.

== Impact ==
During the storm, roofs of most buildings swayed against the walls, eventually settling in the ground. Trinidad was wholly destroyed, though ships in the Gulf of Paria escaped without damage. The storm also caused a boat to travel ashore.

The storm caused ships to sink and killed 1,500 people and caused $7 million USD in damages. According to the Bridgetown Press, Barbados was "laid waste", that no sign of plants was present. The death toll was controversial, with the apparent death toll being much higher.

== See also ==
- Hurricane Georges (1998) – had a similar track
