= Goodwin Island =

Uninhabited island in the Canadian Arctic

- Location within Nunavut Location within Canada

Geography
- Location: Confluence of Hudson Strait and the Labrador Sea
- Coordinates: 60°40′59″N 064°30′00″W
- Archipelago: Arctic Archipelago
- Area: 2 km^{2} (0.77 sq mi)
- Coastline: 7 km (4.3 mi)
- Highest point: 178 m (584 ft)

Administration
- Canada
- Nunavut: Nunavut
- Region: Qikiqtaaluk

Demographics
- Population: Uninhabited
- Source: Goodwin Island at Atlas of Canada

Goodwin Island is one of the many uninhabited Canadian arctic islands in Qikiqtaaluk Region, Nunavut. It is located at the confluence of Hudson Strait and the Labrador Sea.

The island, a member of the Button Islands, is situated west-northwest of Lacy Island. It has a peak of 178 m (584 ft).

Other islands in the immediate vicinity include Erhardt Island, King Island, Lawson Island, MacColl Island, and Observation Island.
