= Erhardt Island =

Island in Nunavut, Canada

- Location within Nunavut Location within Canada

Geography
- Location: Confluence of Hudson Strait and the Labrador Sea
- Coordinates: 60°38′59″N 64°44′59″W
- Archipelago: Arctic Archipelago
- Highest elevation: 107 m (351 ft)

Administration
- Canada
- Nunavut: Nunavut
- Region: Qikiqtaaluk

Demographics
- Population: Uninhabited
- Source: Erhardt Island at Atlas of Canada

Erhardt Island is one of the many uninhabited Canadian arctic islands in Qikiqtaaluk Region, Nunavut. It is located at the confluence of Hudson Strait and the Labrador Sea. The island has an elevation of 107 m (351 ft) above sea level.

It is a member of the Button Islands and is situated 1.5 mi (2.4 km) west of MacColl Island. Other islands in the immediate vicinity include Clark Island, King Island, Lawson Island, Leading Island, and Observation Island.
