= Lacy Island =

Island in Nunavut, Canada

- Location within Nunavut Location within Canada

Geography
- Location: Confluence of Hudson Strait and the Labrador Sea
- Coordinates: 60°40′32″N 64°35′54″W
- Archipelago: Arctic Archipelago
- Highest elevation: 290 m (950 ft)

Administration
- Canada
- Nunavut: Nunavut
- Region: Qikiqtaaluk

Demographics
- Population: Uninhabited
- Source: Lacy Island at Atlas of Canada

Lacy Island is one of the many uninhabited Canadian arctic islands in Qikiqtaaluk Region, Nunavut. It is located at the confluence of Hudson Strait and the Labrador Sea. The island, a member of the Button Islands, is situated in the northeast part of the grouping.

Other islands in the immediate vicinity include Goodwin Island, MacColl Island, Lawson Island, Erhardt Island, and Observation Island.

== Geography ==
Lacy Island has the highest mount of all the Button Islands, rising to 290 m (950 ft) above sea level. The island is square in shape and it offers a sheltered landing area on its southwest side.
