= Clark Island (Nunavut) =

Island in Nunavut, Canada

- Location within Nunavut Location within Canada

Geography
- Location: Confluence of Hudson Strait and the Labrador Sea
- Coordinates: 60.61°N 64.81°W
- Archipelago: Arctic Archipelago
- Highest elevation: 107 m (351 ft)

Administration
- Canada
- Nunavut: Nunavut
- Region: Qikiqtaaluk

Demographics
- Population: Uninhabited

Clark Island is one of the many uninhabited Canadian arctic islands in the Qikiqtaaluk Region, Nunavut. It is located at the confluence of Hudson Strait and the Labrador Sea.

It is a member of the Button Islands and is situated 1.2 mi (1.9 km) west-southwest of the southern end of MacColl Island. Other islands in the immediate vicinity include Dolphin Island, Holdridge Island, King Island, Leading Island, and Niels Island.
