= Dolphin Island (Nunavut) =

Island in Qikiqtaaluk Region, Nunavut, Canada

- Location within Nunavut Location within Canada

Geography
- Location: Confluence of Hudson Strait and the Labrador Sea
- Coordinates: 60°34′0″N 64°46′59″W
- Archipelago: Arctic Archipelago

Administration
- Canada
- Nunavut: Nunavut
- Region: Qikiqtaaluk

Demographics
- Population: Uninhabited
- Source: Dolphin Island at Atlas of Canada

Dolphin Island is one of the many uninhabited Canadian arctic islands in Qikiqtaaluk Region, Nunavut. It is located at the confluence of Hudson Strait and the Labrador Sea.

Dolphin Island, a member of the Button Islands, is small and lies southwest of Holdridge Island.

Other islands in the immediate vicinity include Clark Island, Holdridge Island, King Island, Leading Island, and Niels Island.
