= NAMOC =

NAMOC may refer to

- National Art Museum of China
- Northwest Atlantic Mid-Ocean Channel
