= Canadian Hurricane Centre =

- Centre canadien de prévision des ouragans

Agency overview
- Formed: 1987
- Jurisdiction: Canada
- Headquarters: Dartmouth, Nova Scotia
- Website: https://www.canada.ca/en/environment-climate-change/services/hurricane-forecasts-facts.html

The Canadian Hurricane Centre (CHC; French: Centre canadien de prévision des ouragans) is an organisation that monitors and warns of the threat of tropical cyclones such as hurricanes and tropical storms. CHC is a division of the Meteorological Service of Canada (MSC), which is in turn a branch of Environment and Climate Change Canada. Founded in 1987, CHC provides guidance to MSC's weather centres in eastern and Atlantic Canada, and is based in Dartmouth, Nova Scotia. CHC frequently consults with its United States counterpart, the National Hurricane Center in Miami, to coordinate the tracks and positions of storms that pose a threat to Canada.

== History ==
1985's Hurricane Gloria and its less-than-expected damage prompted Environment Canada to create the CHC due to confusion between information received from the US National Hurricane Centre and US media and on-the-ground information and observations. Its first hurricane warnings were issued in 2008 for Hurricane Kyle, which struck near Yarmouth, Nova Scotia on September 28, 2008, and quickly became extratropical while maintaining much of its strength into New Brunswick and Labrador.

== Duties ==
The organization gathers information on tropical and post-tropical cyclones (systems in the process of becoming extratropical cyclones), predicts their evolution and assesses their potential impact on Canada. Their area of responsibility is bound by the Canada-United States border and extends into waters offshore Canada to 200 nautical miles (370 km). Like other hurricane centres, the Canadian Hurricane Centre makes presentations about tropical cyclones to schools, businesses, the media, and other governmental agencies. They also coordinate with the public concerning additional queries about hurricanes in Canada.

== Frequency ==
While hurricanes are relatively uncommon in Canada, they do approach or strike from time to time. Recent occurrences include:

- Hurricane Bob, which struck Campobello Island, New Brunswick, in 1991.
- Hurricane Luis, which struck Newfoundland in September 1995.
- Hurricane Hortense, which struck Nova Scotia in September 1996.
- Hurricane Michael, which struck Newfoundland in October 2000.
- Hurricane Juan, which struck Nova Scotia in September 2003.
- Hurricane Igor, which struck Newfoundland in September 2010.
- Hurricane Dorian, which struck Nova Scotia in September 2019.
- Hurricane Larry, which struck Newfoundland in September 2021.
- Hurricane Fiona which struck Nova Scotia in September 2022.
- Hurricane Lee, which struck Nova Scotia in September 2023.

Also of note due to its rarity and the damage caused is Hurricane Hazel which hit Toronto, Ontario in 1954, and remained a strong storm even after crossing over the U.S. East Coast.

== See also ==
- Caribbean Disaster Emergency Management Agency (CDEMA)
