= Niels Island =

Island in Nunavut, Canada

- Location within Nunavut Location within Canada

Geography
- Location: Confluence of Hudson Strait and the Labrador Sea
- Coordinates: 60°34′30″N 64°46′59″W
- Archipelago: Arctic Archipelago

Administration
- Canada
- Nunavut: Nunavut
- Region: Qikiqtaaluk

Demographics
- Population: Uninhabited
- Source: Niels Island at Atlas of Canada

Niels Island is one of the many uninhabited Canadian arctic islands in Qikiqtaaluk Region, Nunavut. It is located at the confluence of Hudson Strait and the Labrador Sea.

Niels Island, a member of the Button Islands, is small and lies southwest of Holdridge Island.

Other islands in the immediate vicinity include Clark Island, Dolphin Island, Holdridge Island, King Island, and Leading Island.
