= Hurricane Igor =

Category 4 Atlantic hurricane in 2010

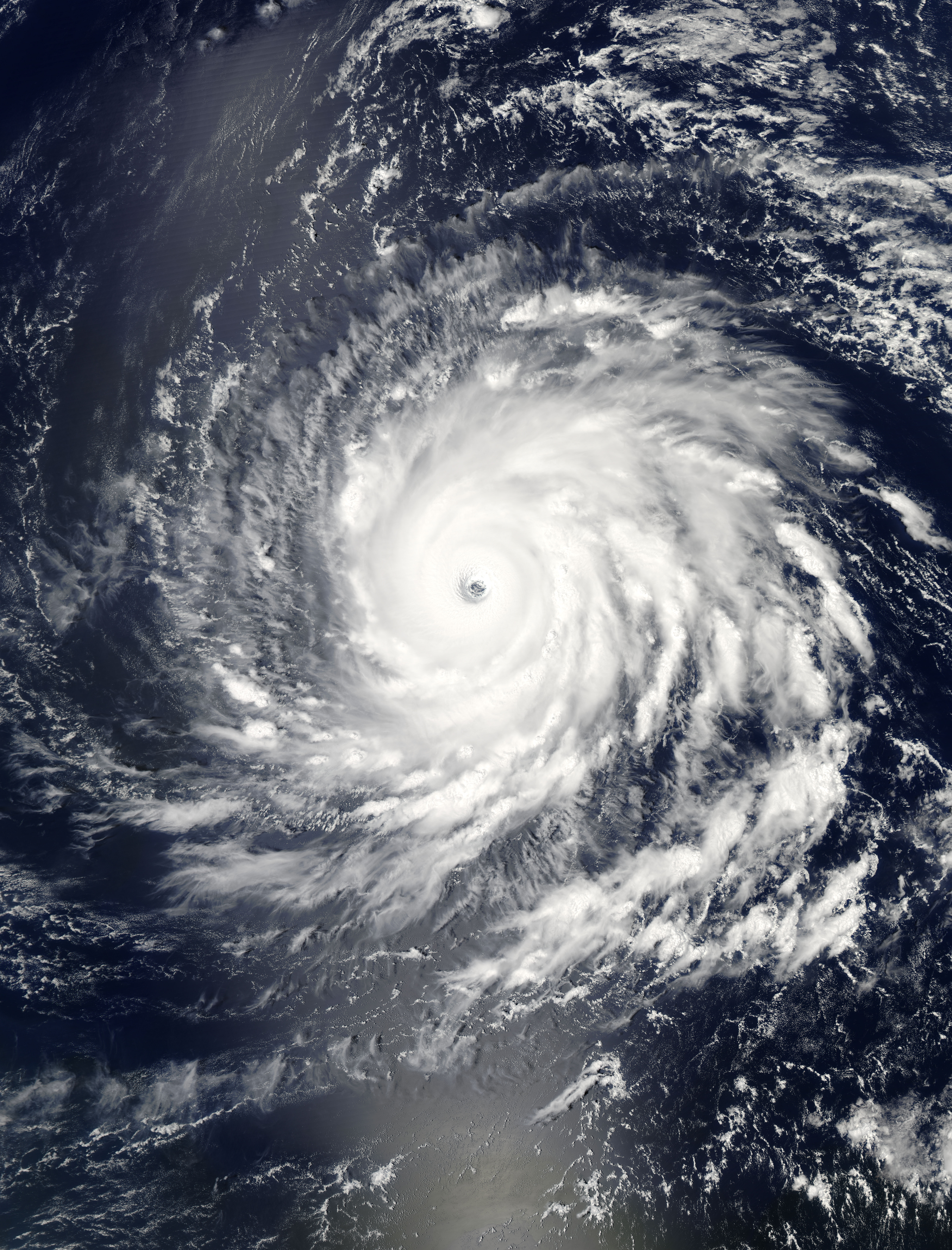
- Hurricane Igor shortly after its initial peak intensity east of the Lesser Antilles on September 13

Meteorological history
- Formed: September 8, 2010
- Extratropical: September 21, 2010
- Dissipated: September 23, 2010

Category 4 major hurricane
- 1-minute sustained (SSHWS/NWS)
- Highest winds: 155 mph (250 km/h)
- Lowest pressure: 924 mbar (hPa); 27.29 inHg

Overall effects
- Fatalities: 4 direct
- Damage: $200 million (2010 USD)
- Areas affected: Cape Verde, Northeastern Caribbean, East Coast of the United States, Bermuda, Newfoundland, Saint Pierre and Miquelon, Southern Greenland
- IBTrACS
- Part of the 2010 Atlantic hurricane season

Hurricane Igor was a very large tropical cyclone which became the most destructive on record to strike the Canadian island of Newfoundland. It originated from a broad area of low pressure that moved off the western coast of Africa on September 6, 2010. Tracking slowly westward, it developed into a tropical depression on September 8 and strengthened into a tropical storm shortly thereafter. Higher wind shear temporarily halted intensification over the following days. On September 12, however, explosive intensification took place, and Igor reached Category 4 status on the Saffir–Simpson scale. By this time, Igor had already begun a prolonged turn around the western periphery of the subtropical ridge. After becoming the strongest cyclone of the season, with maximum sustained winds of 155 mph (249 km/h), it began to enter an area for continued strengthening. Igor gradually weakened before brushing Bermuda as a minimal hurricane on September 20. After turning northeastward, the system began an extratropical transition, which it completed shortly after striking southern Newfoundland. The remnants of Igor were later absorbed by another extratropical cyclone over the Labrador Sea on September 23.

While the hurricane was over the open ocean, it produced large swells that caused the deaths of four people — two in the Caribbean, one in Newfoundland and one in the United States. As it passed west of Bermuda as a minimal hurricane, damage was primarily limited to trees and power lines, with roughly 27,500 residences losing electricity. Total losses in the territory were less than US$500,000. (Note: All damage figures in the article are in 2010 United States dollars (USD) unless otherwise stated.) However, in Newfoundland, Igor brought severe damage, claimed to be the worst ever seen in some areas. Large stretches of roadways were completely washed out by flooding, including a portion of the Trans-Canada Highway, isolating approximately 150 communities. Throughout the region, one person was killed and damage costs amounted to a record USD200 million. In the storm's wake, military personnel were deployed to assist in recovery efforts and aid distribution.

== Meteorological history ==
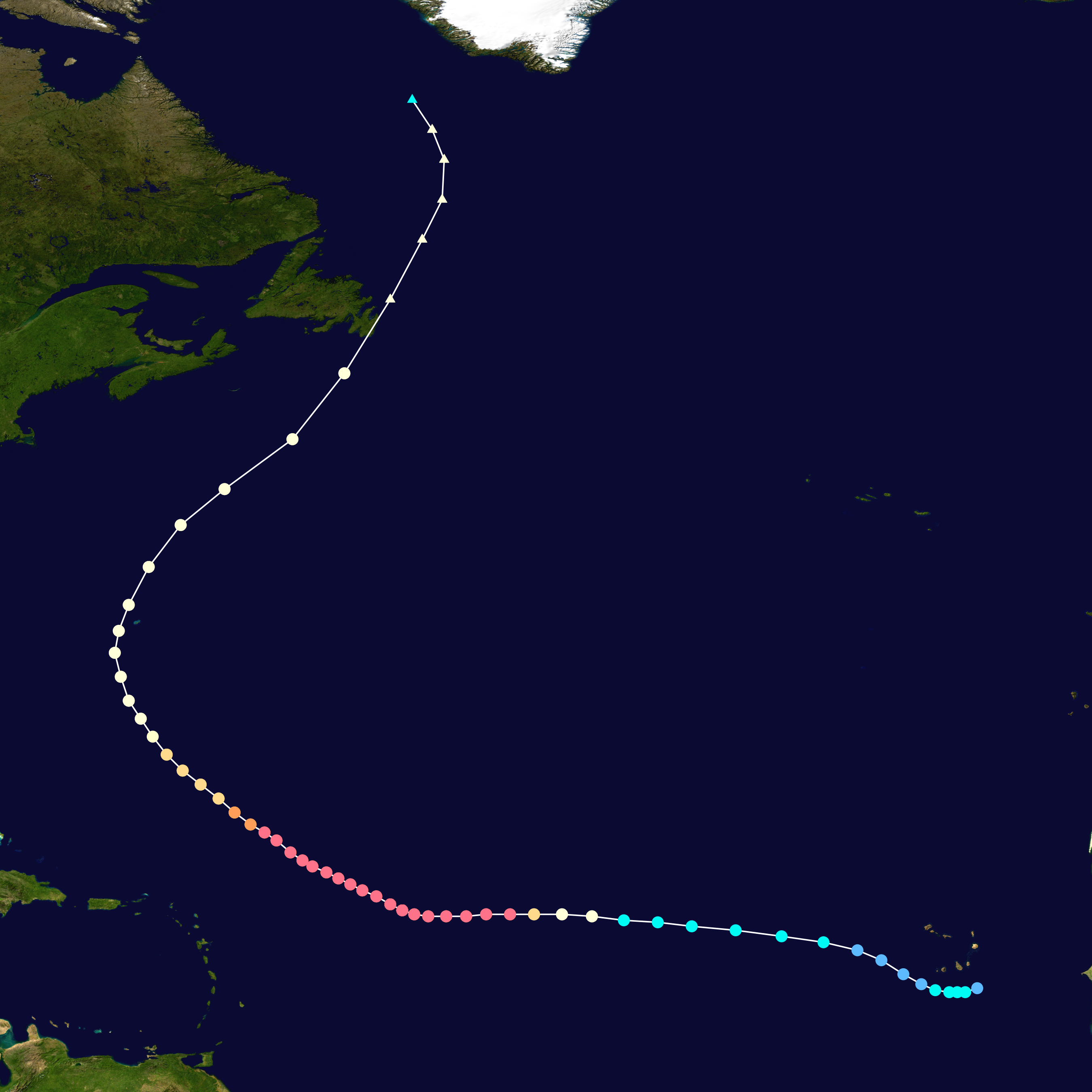
Map plotting the storm's track and intensity, according to the Saffir–Simpson scale Map key Saffir–Simpson scale Tropical depression (≤38 mph, ≤62 km/h) Tropical storm (39–73 mph, 63–118 km/h) Category 1 (74–95 mph, 119–153 km/h) Category 2 (96–110 mph, 154–177 km/h) Category 3 (111–129 mph, 178–208 km/h) Category 4 (130–156 mph, 209–251 km/h) Category 5 (≥157 mph, ≥252 km/h) Unknown Storm type Tropical cyclone Subtropical cyclone Extratropical cyclone, remnant low, tropical disturbance, or monsoon depression

Hurricane Igor was first identified as a broad area of low pressure accompanying a tropical wave over western Africa in early September 2010. Tracking nearly due west, the system emerged into the eastern Atlantic Ocean on September 6. Gradual development took place as convection consolidated around its center. At 06:00 UTC on September 8, the low was deemed sufficiently organized to be classified as a tropical depression while situated roughly 90 mi (140 km) southeast of Cabo Verde. Attaining gale-force winds six hours later, the depression intensified into a tropical storm and was subsequently named Igor by the National Hurricane Center (NHC).

Development of Igor quickly abated once it was named, as a nearby disturbance produced moderate wind shear over the storm, displacing convection from its center. Embedded within a monsoon trough over the eastern Atlantic, the system maintained a slow westward track as it weakened to a tropical depression on September 9. Intensification resumed the following day once shear lessened, while the dominant steering factor shifted to a mid-tropospheric ridge north of Igor; it would remain so throughout the remainder of the cyclone's existence. Contrary to its earlier movement, the storm's forward motion markedly increased. Following the development of an intermittent eye feature and steady convection around its center, Igor strengthened into a hurricane around 00:00 UTC on September 12.

Largest Atlantic hurricanes By diameter of gale-force winds
Rank	System	Season	Diameter	
Rank	System	Season	mi	km
1	Sandy	2012	1,150	1,850
2	Martin	2022	1,040	1,670
3	Igor	2010	920	1,480
4	Olga	2001	865	1,390
5	Teddy	2020	850	1,370

Once classified a hurricane, Igor underwent explosive intensification over the following 24 hours. During this time, satellite estimates indicated that the storm's winds increased from 75 to 150 mph (121 to 241 km/h) and its barometric pressure decreased by 52 mbar (hPa; 1.53 inHg). Near the end of this phase, forecasters at the NHC predicted that Igor would attain Category 5 status, the highest classification on the Saffir–Simpson scale. With a symmetrical 17 mi (27 km) wide eye, deep convection, and spiral banding, Igor maintained Category 4 intensity for nearly five days. Minor fluctuations took place during this period as multiple eyewall replacement cycles occurred. After the first of these cycles, the hurricane is estimated to have reached its peak strength around 00:00 UTC on September 15, with 1-minute sustained winds of 155 mph (249 km/h) and an estimated minimum central pressure of 924 mbar (hPa; 27.29 inHg).

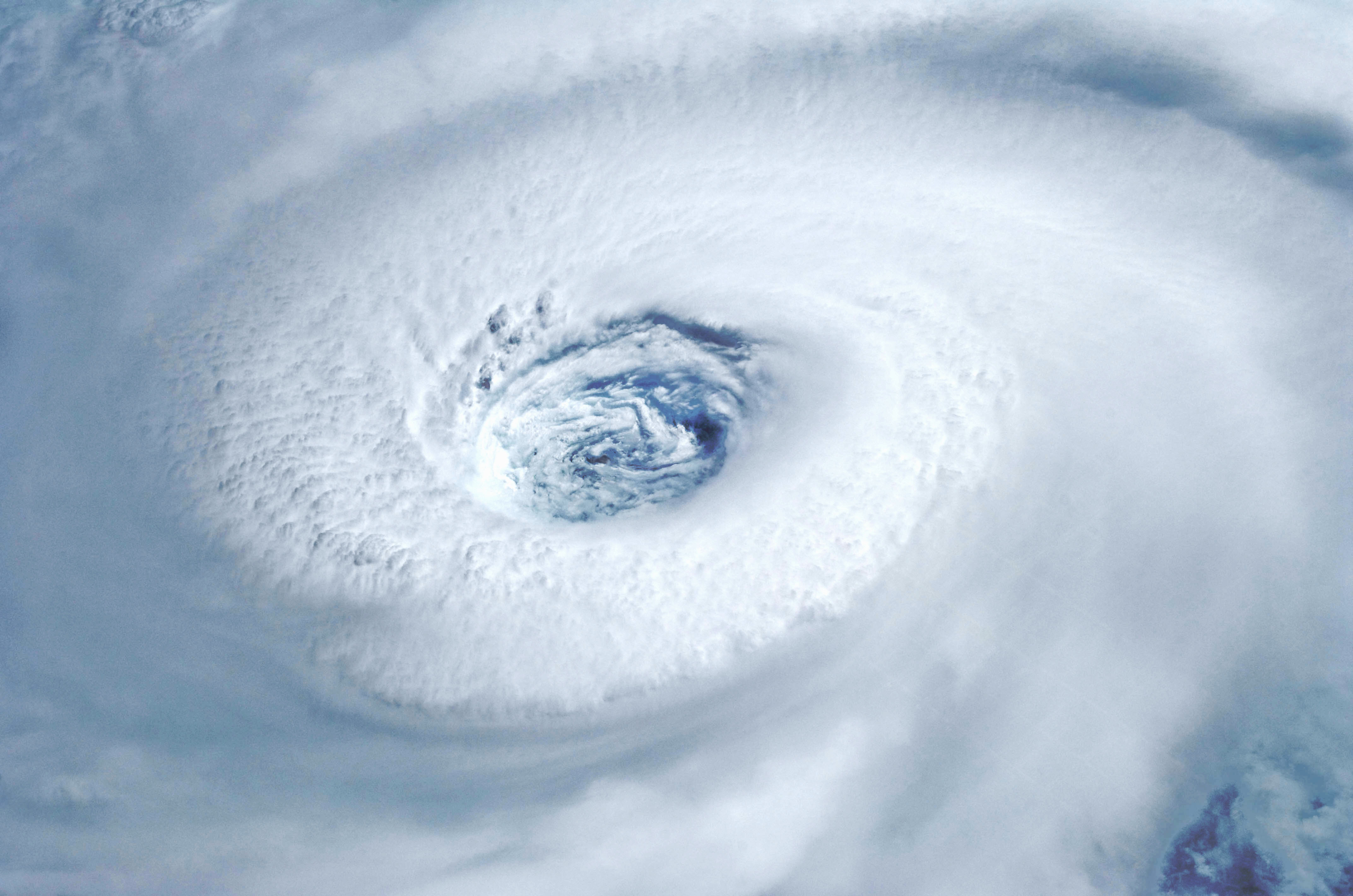
Photograph of Hurricane Igor's eye on September 14 from the International Space Station

Passing roughly 345 mi (555 km) northeast of the Leeward Islands on September 17, Igor gradually weakened as it experienced increased wind shear and dry air intrusion. Over the following several days, the storm curved toward the north and became exceedingly large, with tropical storm-force winds covering an area about 865 mi (1,392 km) wide. Due to an overestimated bias in Igor's intensity, forecasts from the NHC showed that the storm would strike Bermuda as a major hurricane. However, weakening was more marked than anticipated, and by the time its center neared the territory on September 20, winds decreased to 75 mph (121 km/h). Igor made its closest approach to Bermuda around 02:30 UTC, passing roughly 40 mi (64 km) to the west-northwest.

Once north of Bermuda, Igor began to undergo extratropical transition as it turned northeastward. Though deep convection was no longer consistently over its center, the storm maintained hurricane intensity as supported by data from hurricane hunters. Accelerating along the leading edge of a trough over the Canadian Maritimes, the storm intensified within a baroclinic zone as it neared Newfoundland. The interaction between these two systems allowed the hurricane to strengthen despite moving over decreasing sea surface temperatures. Around 1500 UTC on September 21, Igor made landfall near Cape Race, with winds of 85 mph (137 km/h). Shortly thereafter, the storm completed its transition into an extratropical cyclone as it became fully embedded within the baroclinic zone. After turning northwestward between Labrador and Greenland, Igor's center split on September 22, with the newer low to the west quickly becoming more powerful. Early on September 23, the remnants of Igor were absorbed by the new extratropical cyclone, within the Labrador Sea. For the next several days, this storm slowly moved eastward, before being absorbed into another developing low to the east on September 27, near Greenland.

== Preparations and impact ==
=== Cape Verde and Leeward Islands ===
Forming near Cabo Verde, Igor prompted the issuance of tropical storm watches for the southern islands on September 8. Only minimal effects were recorded as the storm passed closely nearby. Once the cyclone tracked away from the islands, the watches were discontinued on September 9.

Although several hundred miles from the Leeward Islands, Igor produced large swells averaging 9 to 13 ft (2.7 to 4.0 m) in height, between September 16 and 21. There were also large breaking waves of 15 to 20 ft (4.6 to 6.1 m) or higher. The prolonged period of this event resulted in minor coastal flooding in St. Croix. One person drowned near Carambola Beach Resort after being overcome by large swells. Similar conditions affected Puerto Rico where another person drowned. On several occasions, Luquillo was flooded by the surf, though no damage took place. In nearby Haiti, still reeling from a devastating earthquake in January, officials warned residents of possible relocation from "tent cities" to safer areas. An orange alert was declared across the country, indicating that heavy rains could result in flooding. Portions of the Greater Antilles were affected by large swells and rip currents for several days as Igor approached Bermuda.

=== Bermuda ===
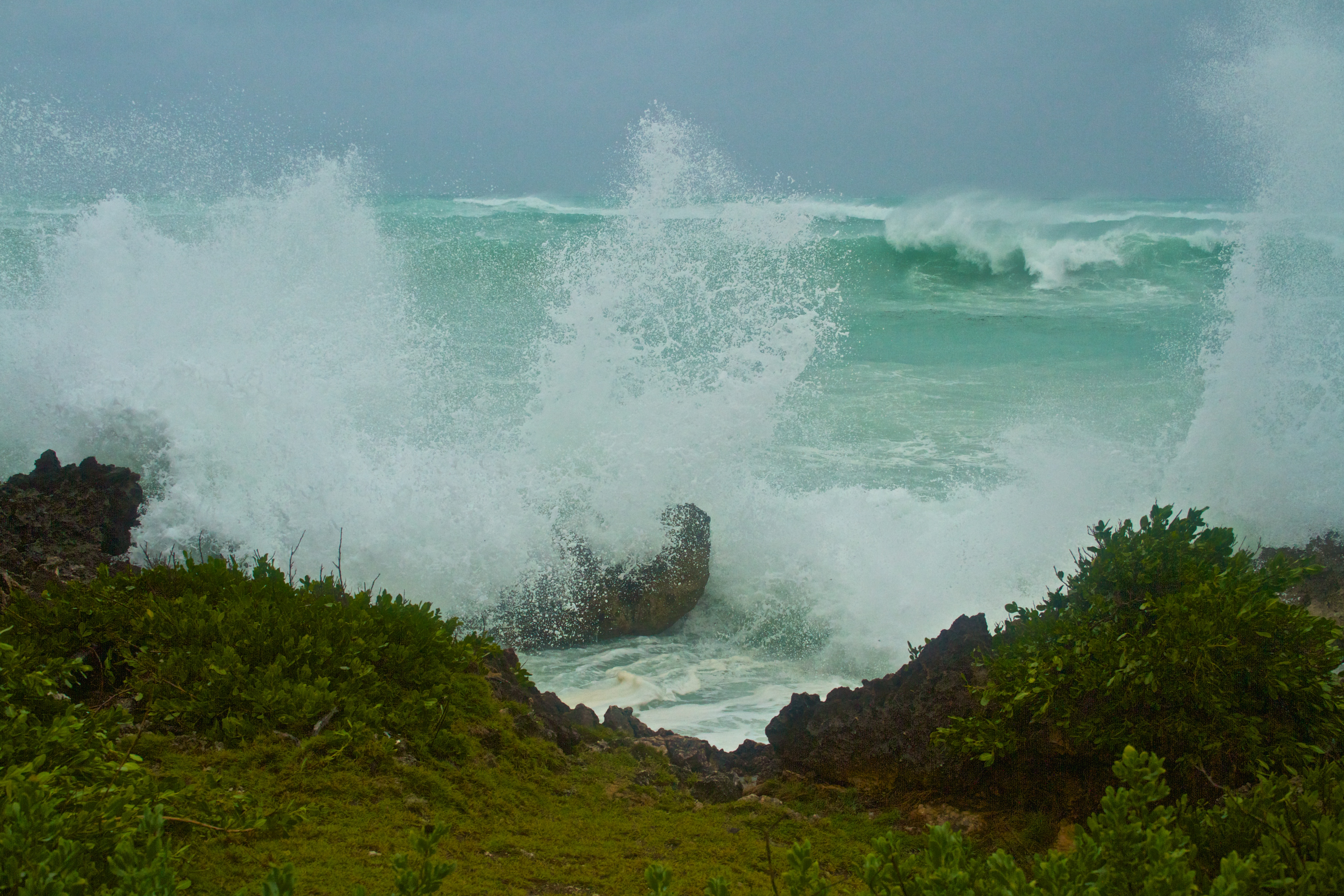
Large waves impacted the coast of Bermuda for several days prior to and following Igor's passage, some of which were up to 15 feet (4.6 m) high.

Long seen to be within Igor's track, Bermuda was placed under a hurricane watch on September 17 as the threat became imminent. Later that day, the watch was upgraded to a warning as hurricane-force winds were anticipated to impact the islands within 24 hours. This remained in place for nearly three days while Igor impacted Bermuda. Following the passage of hurricane winds, the hurricane warning was changed to a tropical storm warning early on September 20 before being discontinued later that day.

The Bermuda government closed its schools and the Bermuda International Airport on September 20 and 21 in anticipation of Igor. No evacuation plans were put in place, although a local high school was converted into a shelter for residents who felt unsafe in their homes. Residents boarded up structures with plywood in order to protect windows. Tourists on the island wanting to escape the storm left more than a week before Igor's arrival. Additionally, a British Royal Navy vessel and helicopter were stationed offshore to assist with recovery efforts once the storm passed. Prior to Igor's arrival, there were fears that the large hurricane would be worse than Hurricane Fabian in 2003 and could "flatten" the territory. These fears resulted from forecasts from the National Hurricane Center which indicated the storm would strike Bermuda as a Category 3 hurricane. However, following post-storm analysis, it was found that the forecast model consensus overestimated the storm's future intensity.

Although effects from Igor were observed in Bermuda for several days, relatively little rain fell, with the highest amount being 3.19 in (81 mm). Winds proved to be the most significant factor. Sustained winds reached 91 mph (146 km/h) and gusts peaked at 117 mph (188 km/h) at an unofficial AWOS station on St. David's Lighthouse. Additionally, a storm surge of 1.75 ft (0.53 m) took place in St. George's; this combined with tides to produce a storm tide of over 4 ft (1.2 m). As the storm arrived, the island's airport was shut down earlier than originally planned due to the threat of tornadoes. Against initial fears, Igor left relatively little damage across Bermuda. The most significant impact was from downed trees and powerlines which cut power to 27,500 residents. A few emergency rescues were undertaken during the storm but no injuries occurred. The causeway-bridge connecting St. George's Islands to the main island of Bermuda sustained minor damage, leaving one lane closed for several days. Waves over 15 ft (4.6 m) battered the coast, breaking several ships from their moorings and tossing them into rocks. Officials in Bermuda stated that the biggest loss from Igor would be lessened tourism revenue following a mass exodus prior to the hurricane's arrival. Throughout the islands, damage from the storm was less than $500,000.

=== United States ===
Though Igor's closest approach to the contiguous United States only brought it within 600 mi (970 km) of land, its large circulation produced significant swells along the entire East Coast. High surf advisories were issued in Long Island, New York, as waves of 6 to 10 ft (1.8 to 3.0 m) affected the area. Rip currents in Florida pulled four people out to sea who were later rescued. One person drowned in Surf City, North Carolina after being overwhelmed by rough surf. Along the New Jersey coastline, waves averaging between 6 and 9 ft (1.8 and 2.7 m) and dangerous rip currents were reported.

=== Canada ===
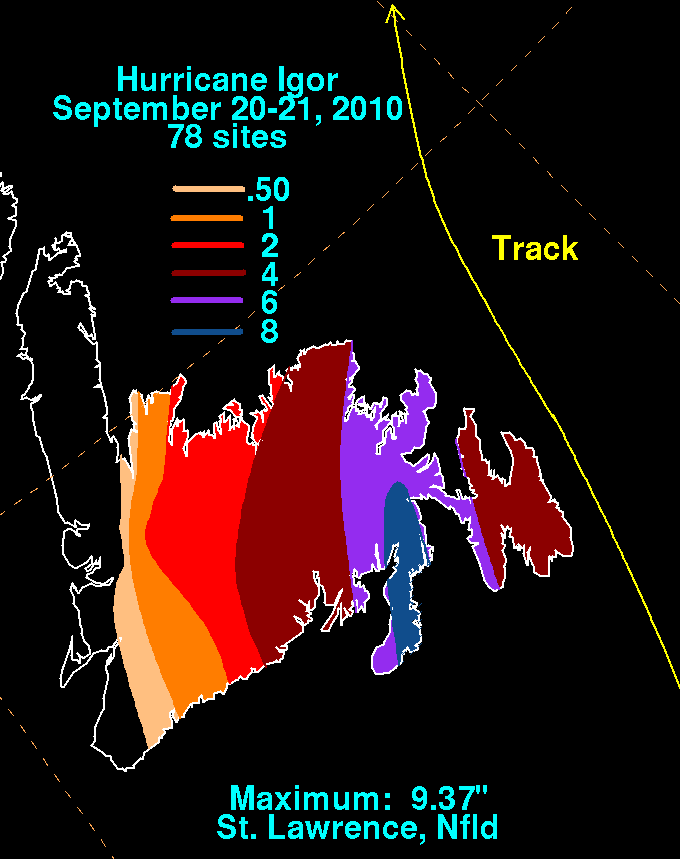
Rainfall from Hurricane Igor in Newfoundland

On September 20, roughly one day prior to Igor's arrival in Atlantic Canada, the Canadian Hurricane Center (CHC) issued tropical storm watches and warnings for southern Newfoundland and the French territory of Saint Pierre and Miquelon. The following day, the CHC issued a hurricane watch for the eastern and northern coasts. Although sustained hurricane-force winds were recorded across parts of the island, warnings were not issued due to stronger-than-expected re-intensification of the storm as it transitioned into an extratropical cyclone. Early on September 22, all advisories were discontinued as Igor moved away from the region. In response to the storm's arrival, schools were closed, and several flights were delayed or cancelled at St. John's International Airport. Offshore, an oil rig with 110 personnel was mostly evacuated near the coast of Newfoundland on September 19. In comparison to Hurricane Earl two weeks earlier, there was substantially less media attention given to Igor, attributed to the possibility of it going out to sea.

The combination of a stationary front and significant moisture from Hurricane Igor resulted in torrential rainfall across parts of eastern Newfoundland, leading to widespread flooding. In Bonavista, more than 10 in (250 mm) was estimated to have fallen between September 20 and 21. (Note: Rain gauge failed several hours before the rain ended, the 10 in (250 mm) was estimated by the National Hurricane Center. The Canadian representative to the World Meteorological Organization estimates a total of 9.25 in (235 mm).) In St. Lawrence, a confirmed 9.37 in (238 mm) of rain fell, ranking Igor as the third-wettest tropical cyclone in Canadian history. The widespread nature of heavy rains ranked the storm as a 1-in-100 year event. Winds across eastern Newfoundland were also exacerbated by the interaction of the front and Igor. In Cape Pine, near where the center of the cyclone tracked, sustained winds of 80 mph (130 km/h) and gusts to 107 mph (172 km/h) affected the area. (Note: The sustained wind reports are based on 10-minute standards.) No records for sustained winds or gusts were broken; however, it was noted as a 1-in-50 year event even with powerful winter storms taken into account. Along the coast, Igor produced a storm tide of 3.5 ft (1.1 m). Additionally, offshore waves reached immense heights, measured up to 83.6 ft (25.5 m); one buoy reported a wave of 92 ft (28 m), but that data is subject to further analysis to verify it.

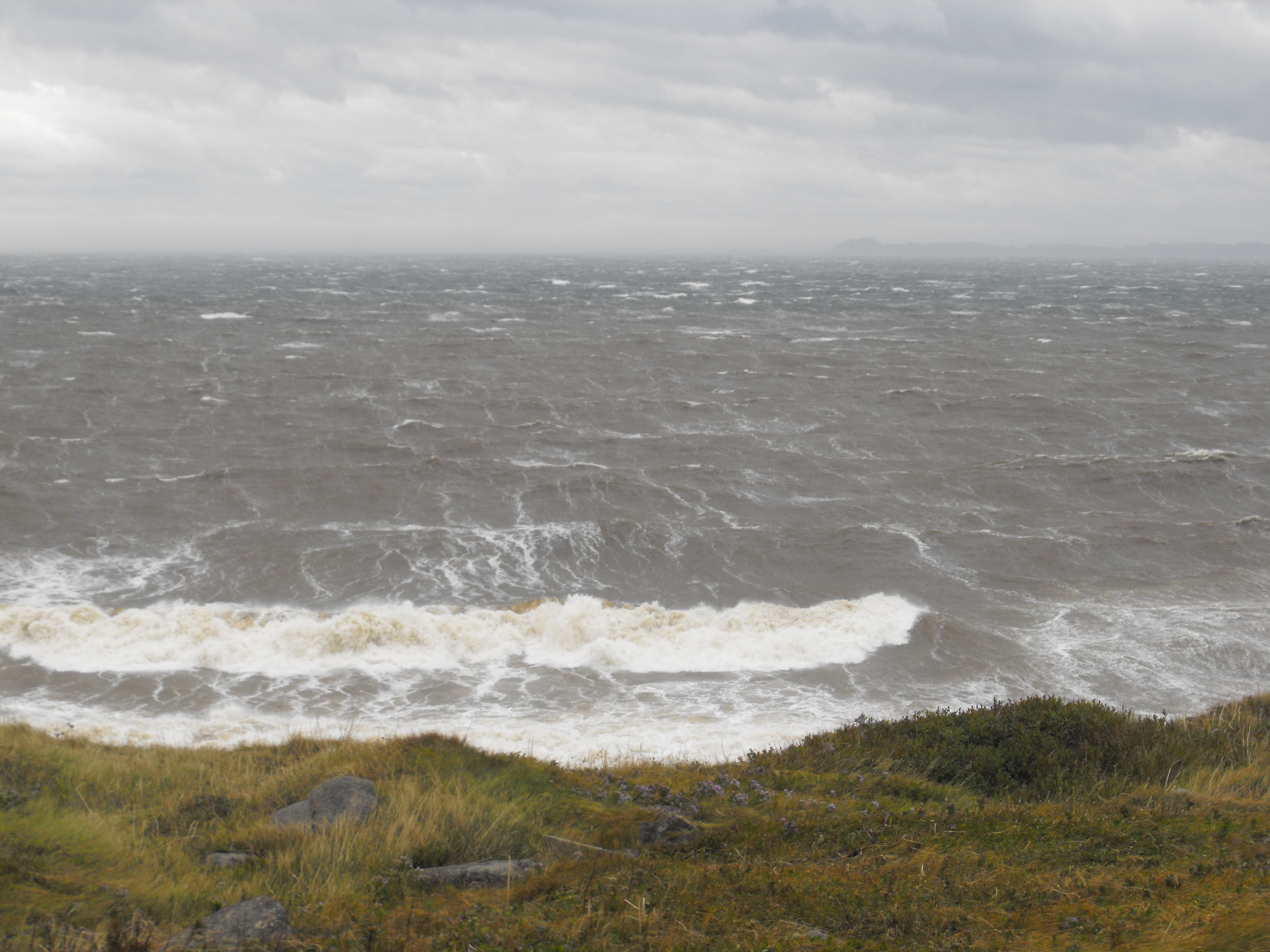
Strong waves at Fortune, Newfoundland and Labrador from Hurricane Igor

The most significant impacts from Igor were attributed to torrential rains, which led to excessive runoff and flash flooding. Several rivers rose to record levels across the Bonavista and Burin peninsulas where many roads were washed out. Entire bridges, homes, and portions of roads were destroyed. In some instances, flood waters overtook the height of houses. In response to the widespread floods, Newfoundland Power Inc. warned residents who still had power by the afternoon of September 21 to turn off their main electrical panel if water entered their basement. Parts of St. Bernard's – Jacques Fontaine had to be evacuated by boat during the storm as rising water flooded some areas of the small town. Portions of Clarenville were evacuated under similar circumstances after a state of emergency was declared for the town. Water and sewage lines in Sunnyside broke due to flooding. In Glovertown, downed power lines sparked two fires, both of which were put out by firefighters without injuries.

Roughly 150 communities were temporarily isolated as all roads leading to them were severely damaged or washed out. Overall damage to roadways was regarded as "colossal" by Tom Hedderson, the minister for emergency preparedness. A 100 ft (30 m) section of the Trans-Canada Highway in Terra Nova National Park was severely eroded, leaving a large ravine behind and disconnecting the main population of Newfoundland from the rest of the island. A bridge washout on the Burin Peninsula left 20,000 people cut off from the rest of the island. Public infrastructure losses were estimated in excess of $100 million, mainly attributed to roadways. On Random Island, a man was killed when his driveway collapsed from flooding and he was swept out to sea.

In addition to flood damage, hurricane-force winds downed trees and power lines across a wide region, and many homes were damaged to varying degrees. An estimated 50,000 residences were left without electricity. The small coastal community of South East Bight sustained some of the most significant wind damage, where entire fishing sheds were hurled into the air. Along the East Coast hiking trail, an estimated 5,000 trees were downed. In all, losses from the hurricane were placed at $200 million, ranking it as the costliest cyclone in Newfoundland history. In terms of its overall impact, Igor was regarded as the worst storm of tropical origin to hit Newfoundland since Hurricane Two in 1935.

== Aftermath ==
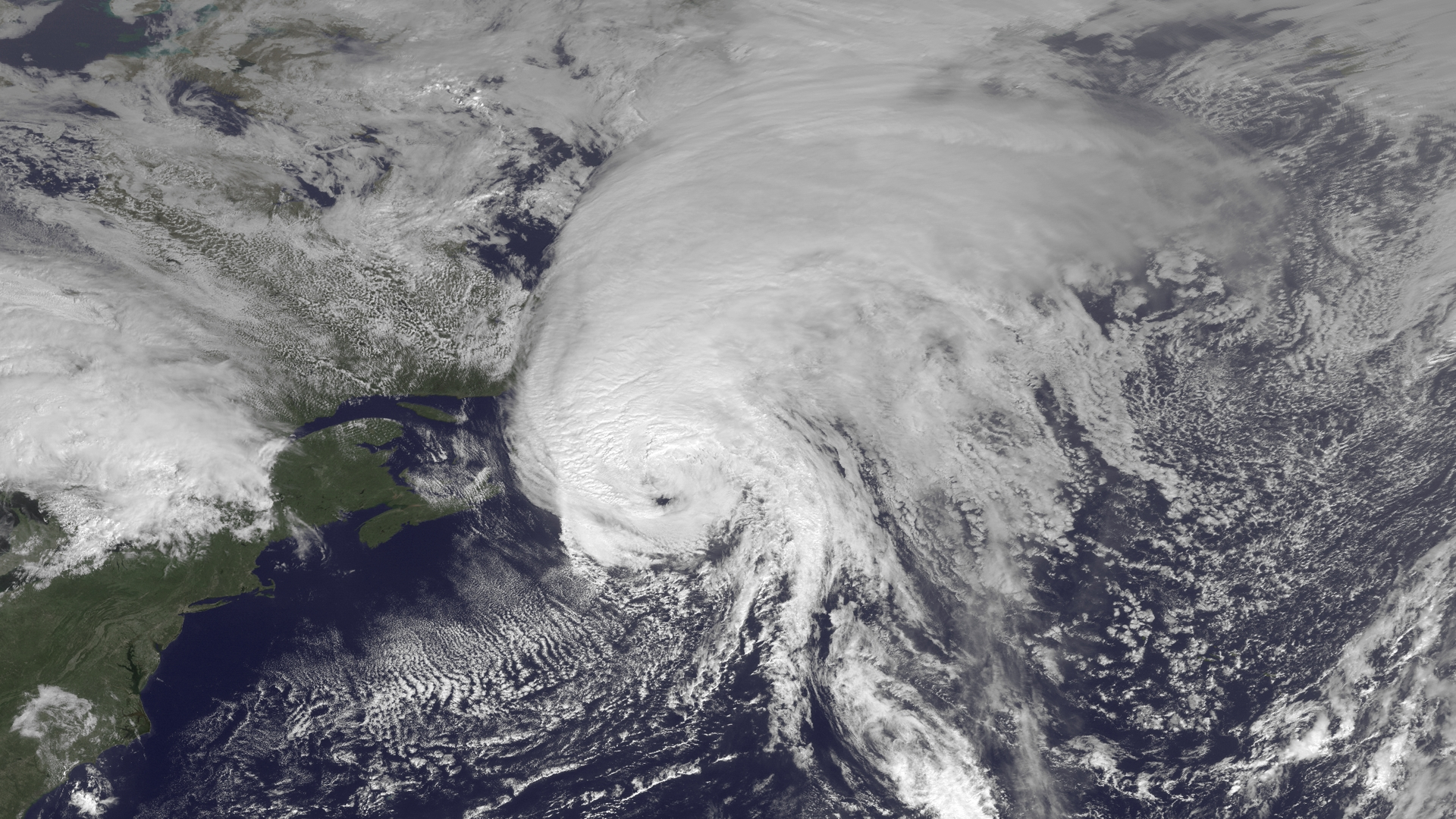
Satellite image of Hurricane Igor on September 21 as it made landfall on Newfoundland

In Igor's wake, a state of emergency was declared for 30 communities in Newfoundland. The mayor of one of the towns affected by Igor, Sam Synard, remarked that "We've never seen such a violent storm before." More than 50 families were relocated to evacuation shelters. Electricity was gradually restored to residents; by six days after the hurricane's passage, a few hundred had yet to regain power.

In light of the widespread damage, 1,000 personnel from the Canadian military were brought in for recovery efforts. The military operation, known as Operation Lama, was to last for the duration of the emergency phase in the immediate aftermath. An initial deployment of 120 soldiers and 40 vehicles arrived on September 25 from the Canadian Forces Base Gagetown in Oromocto, New Brunswick. Three ships and a fleet of helicopters were called in for the distribution of emergency aid, and the military set up temporary bridges while long-term plans for reconstruction were made. Operation Lama also enabled partial repairs of several buildings, and simultaneously, emergency personnel surveyed roughly 500 mi (800 km) of roads in Newfoundland. On September 27, government officials stated that it would take months for clean-up efforts to be completed. Ten days after the storm, six towns were still isolated as slow progress on temporary road reconstruction was made. Allocation of military aid continued through October 6, though the number of on-scene personnel began to decrease two days earlier.

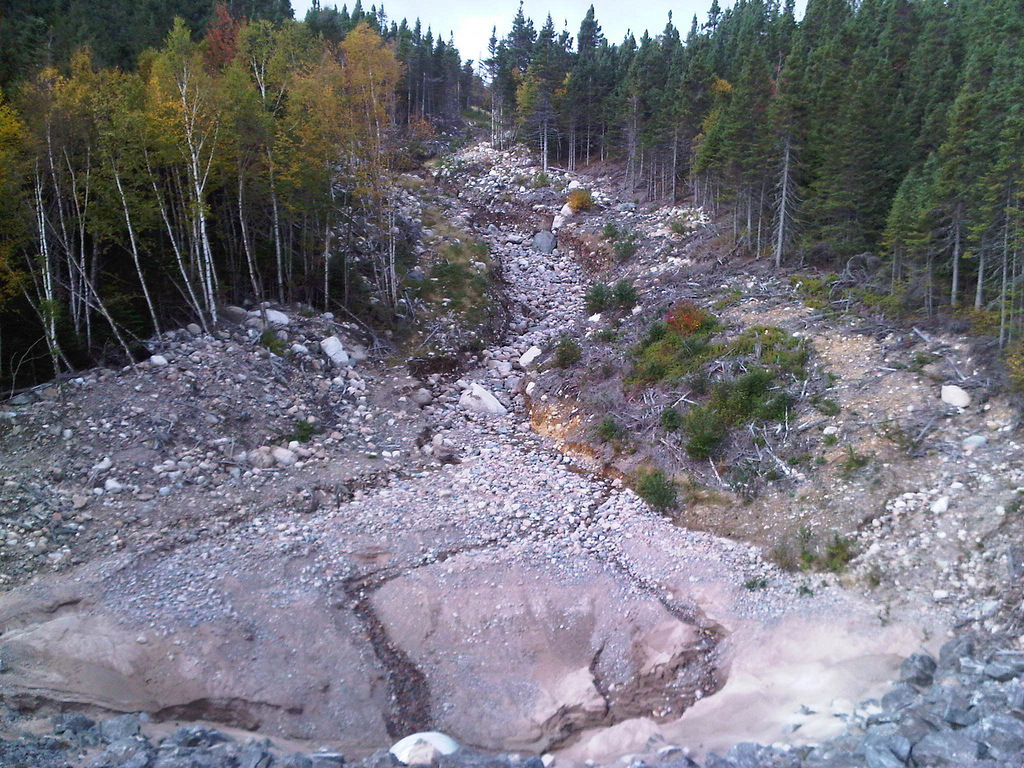
Many rivers and streams across Newfoundland surpassed their banks, washing out adjacent terrain.

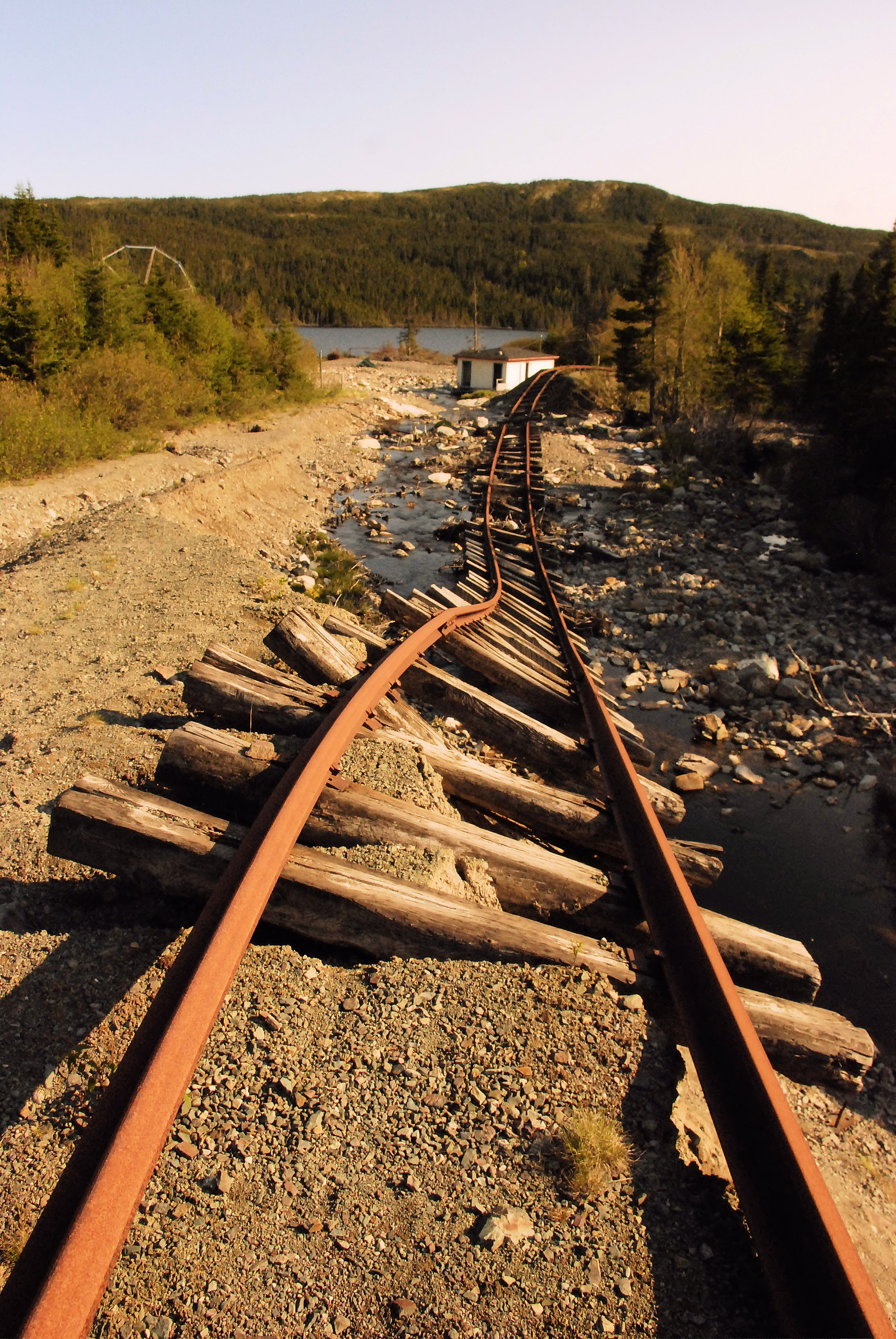
The Trinity Train Loop in Newfoundland was damaged by Hurricane Igor

Roughly a month after the storm, a benefit concert was held in St. John's. The concert raised about $400,000 (2010 CAD) toward storm relief in one night. In late October, the Government of Newfoundland and Labrador allocated $275,000 in funds for 200 workers who lost their jobs after two fish processing plants were damaged in Marystown and Port Union. However, union leaders claimed that the assistance was insufficient and accounted for just 420 of 600 work hours. Following more than a year of discussions, the plant's parent company, Ocean Choice International, decided to permanently shut down operations on December 2, 2011. Numerous insurance claims, reaching $65 million by early November, were made following Hurricane Igor's landfall. Over the course of the recovery phase, several complaints, including concerns lodged by church ministers, remarked that relief funds were not being distributed fast enough and the overall process was taking too long. Roughly ten months after the hurricane, work on permanent reconstruction of roadways began in several areas across the Burin Peninsula. By January 24, 2011, The Salvation Army received about $1.6 million worth of donations, roughly half of which had been distributed at that point. An additional $200,000 had been pledged by donors.

In June 2011, a federal document detailing the actions made by province officials was released to be public and incited further outcry from residents affected by the storm. The main complaint raised was related to the delay in accepting federal aid despite the severity of the damage. In an email sent on September 21, 2010, Denys Doiron, the nation's Emergency Preparedness and Response Officer, relayed that local emergency services reported Igor to be the worst disaster they ever experienced. Doiron also stated that no requests for federal aid were made.

On September 12, 2011, nearly a year after the passage of Igor, a weather buoy from St. John's was spotted near the Shetland Islands north of Scotland. In early October, Newfoundland was again struck by a tropical cyclone – Hurricane Ophelia. Though a weaker storm, Ophelia caused more damage than expected as it destroyed infrastructure repaired in the wake of Igor. The mayor of Marystown criticized government officials for not increasing the size of repairs, especially to culverts, to account for flooding.

== Retirement ==
Because of the extensive damage the hurricane caused in Newfoundland, the name Igor was retired in the spring of 2011 by the World Meteorological Organization, and will never again be used for an Atlantic tropical cyclone. It was replaced with Ian for the 2016 season.

== See also ==
- Timeline of the 2010 Atlantic hurricane season
- Tropical cyclones in 2010
- List of Category 4 Atlantic hurricanes
- List of Bermuda hurricanes
- List of Canada hurricanes
- Hurricane Larry (2021) – took a similar track and also made landfall on Newfoundland
