= Melanella orphanensis =

- Shell of Melanella orphanensis

Scientific classification
- Kingdom: Animalia
- Phylum: Mollusca
- Class: Gastropoda
- Subclass: Caenogastropoda
- Order: Littorinimorpha
- Family: Eulimidae
- Genus: Melanella
- Species: M. orphanensis

Binomial name
- Melanella orphanensis A. H. Clarke, 1974

Species of gastropod

Melanella orphanensis is a species of sea snail, a marine gastropod mollusk in the family Eulimidae. The species is one of many species known to exist within the genus, Melanella.

== Description ==
The length of the shell attains 4.2 mm, its diameter 1.3 mm.

== Distribution ==
This marine species occurs in the Labrador Sea
