= Knight Islands =

Island group in Nunavut, Canada

- Location within Nunavut Location within Canada

Geography
- Location: Labrador Sea
- Coordinates: 60°34′23″N 64°34′29″W
- Archipelago: Arctic Archipelago
- Area: 8 km^{2} (3.1 sq mi)
- Highest point: Knight Summit, 213 m (699 ft)

Administration
- Canada
- Nunavut: Nunavut
- Region: Qikiqtaaluk

Demographics
- Population: Uninhabited
- Source: Knight Islands at Atlas of Canada

The uninhabited Knight Islands are members of the Arctic Archipelago in the territory of Nunavut. They are located in Gray Strait, an arm of the Labrador Sea. The Knight Islands measure 8 km^{2} (3.1 sq mi).

The largest of the Knight Islands is 2.5 mi (4.0 km) long and 1.7 mi (2.7 km) wide. Knight Summit, at the north part of the island, rises to 213 m (699 ft) above sea level.

The larger Button Islands are about 5 km (3.1 mi) to the northwest. The Cape Chidley Islands are 18.2 km (11.3 mi) away.
