= Hurricane Gloria =

Category 4 Atlantic hurricane in 1985

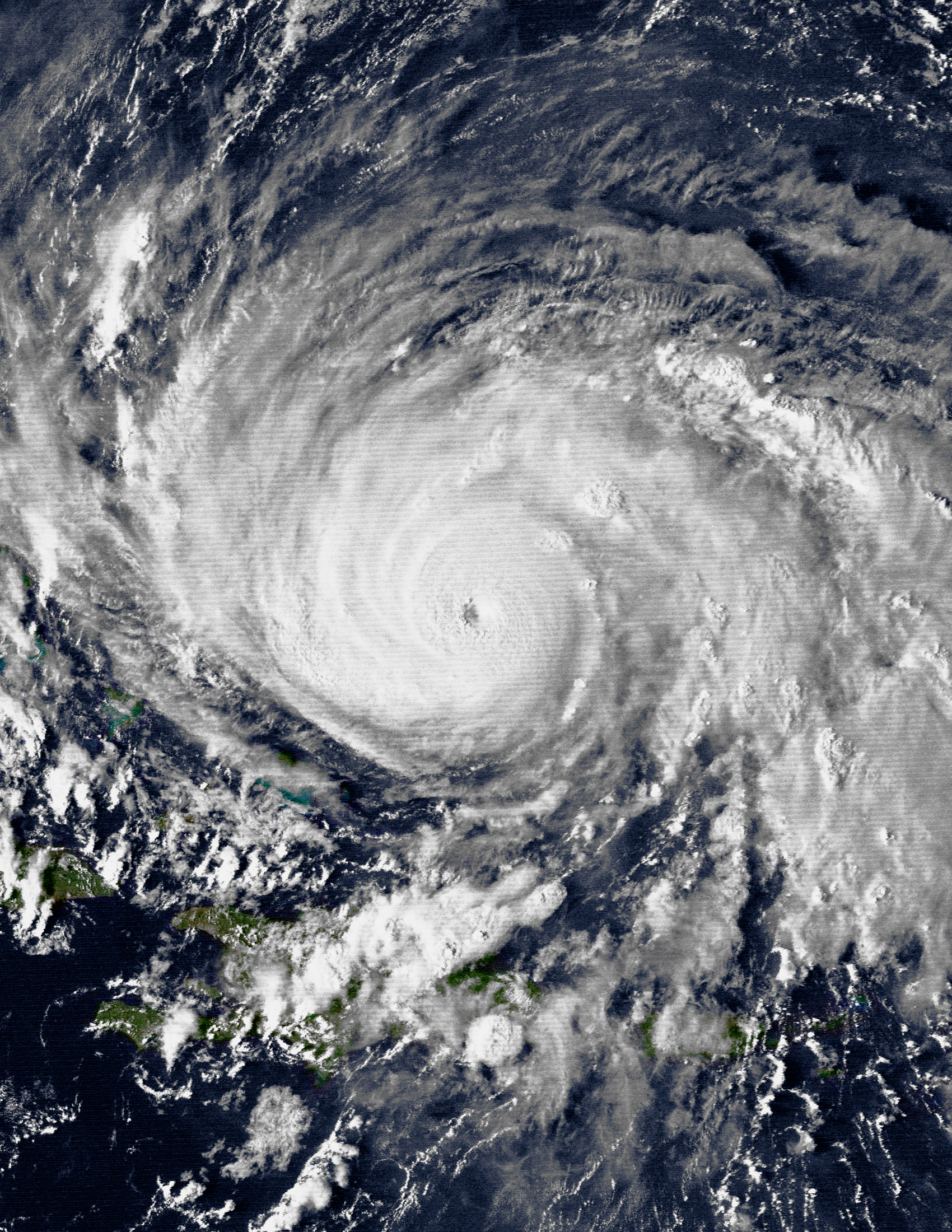
- Gloria near peak intensity north of Hispaniola on September 24

Meteorological history
- Formed: September 16, 1985
- Extratropical: September 28, 1985
- Dissipated: October 4, 1985

Category 4 major hurricane
- 1-minute sustained (SSHWS/NWS)
- Highest winds: 145 mph (230 km/h)
- Lowest pressure: 920 mbar (hPa); 27.17 inHg

Overall effects
- Fatalities: 14
- Damage: $900 million (1985 USD)
- Areas affected: North Carolina, Mid-Atlantic states, New England, Atlantic Canada, Western Europe
- IBTrACS
- Part of the 1985 Atlantic hurricane season

Hurricane Gloria was a powerful tropical cyclone that caused significant damage along the East Coast of the United States and in Atlantic Canada during the 1985 Atlantic hurricane season. It was the first significant tropical cyclone to strike the northeastern United States since Hurricane Agnes in 1972 and the first major storm to affect New York City and Long Island directly since Hurricane Donna in 1960. Gloria was a Cape Verde hurricane originating from a tropical wave on September 16 in the eastern Atlantic Ocean. After remaining a weak tropical cyclone for several days, Gloria intensified into a hurricane on September 22 north of the Lesser Antilles. During that time, the storm had moved generally westward, although it turned to the northwest due to a weakening of the ridge. Gloria quickly intensified on September 24, and the next day reached peak winds of 145 mph (233 km/h). The hurricane weakened before striking the Outer Banks of North Carolina on September 27. Later that day, Gloria made two subsequent landfalls on Long Island and across the coastline of western Connecticut, before becoming extratropical on September 28 over New England. The remnants moved through Atlantic Canada and went on to impact Western Europe, eventually dissipating on October 4.

Before Gloria made landfall, the National Hurricane Center issued hurricane warnings at some point for the East Coast of the United States from South Carolina to Maine. Hundreds of thousands of people evacuated, and the hurricane was described as the "storm of the century." In general, Gloria's strongest winds remained east of the center, which largely spared locations from North Carolina to New Jersey, and the passage at low tide reduced storm surge. Hurricane-force winds and gusts affected much of the path, which knocked down trees and power lines. This left over 4 million people without power, causing the worst power outage in Connecticut history related to a natural disaster. Fallen trees caused six of the storm's fourteen deaths.

In North Carolina, high waves damaged many homes along the Outer Banks and caused heavy beach erosion. High waves also damaged piers, boats, and docks throughout the Mid-Atlantic states. Flooding forced several highways to close, and in Pennsylvania, thousands were forced to evacuate their homes. The storm surge destroyed 48 homes on Long Island, while the winds damaged the roofs of many more. Widespread crop damage occurred, amounting to about $20 million (1985 USD) (Note: All damage totals are in 1985 United States dollars.). Overall damage in the United States was estimated at $900 million, which was less than expected. In neighboring Canada, the remnants of Gloria caused minor power outages in New Brunswick, although confusion related to the storm's arrival led to the creation of the Canadian Hurricane Centre.

== Meteorological history ==
Map plotting the storm's track and intensity, according to the Saffir–Simpson scale Map key Saffir–Simpson scale Tropical depression (≤38 mph, ≤62 km/h) Tropical storm (39–73 mph, 63–118 km/h) Category 1 (74–95 mph, 119–153 km/h) Category 2 (96–110 mph, 154–177 km/h) Category 3 (111–129 mph, 178–208 km/h) Category 4 (130–156 mph, 209–251 km/h) Category 5 (≥157 mph, ≥252 km/h) Unknown Storm type Tropical cyclone Subtropical cyclone Extratropical cyclone, remnant low, tropical disturbance, or monsoon depression

A tropical wave (Note: A tropical wave is a trough that moves along the trade winds.) moved off the west coast of Africa on September 15. Based on data from satellite imagery, it is estimated that a tropical depression formed on September 16 near Cape Verde, with an associated low-level circulation. The next day, the depression intensified into Tropical Storm Gloria, but there was no further intensification. On September 18, Gloria weakened back to tropical depression status, but re-intensified into a tropical storm on September 20. During this time, it moved generally westward due to a strong ridge to the north. On September 21, the Hurricane Hunters began flying into Gloria to measure the storm's intensity, and the next day, a flight observed winds of 78 mph (126 km/h) at a height of 1,500 ft (460 m). As a result, the National Hurricane Center (NHC) upgraded Gloria to a hurricane about 465 mi (748 km) east-northeast of the Lesser Antilles.

After having moved generally to the west, Gloria turned more to the west-northwest on September 22. This occurred after tropical storms Fabian and Henri weakened the ridge. On September 23, Gloria passed about 155 miles (249 km) to the north of Anegada, the northernmost island in the Lesser Antilles. It initially remained a minimal hurricane until September 24 when it began quickly intensifying. That day, it became a major hurricane (Note: A major hurricane is a Category 3 or higher on the Saffir-Simpson hurricane wind scale.) while passing northeast of the Bahamas. Gloria developed a 10 mi (16 km) wide eye, surrounded by an eyewall, and was producing the stadium effect. At 01:20 UTC on September 25, Hurricane Hunters extrapolated a barometric pressure of 919 mbar (27.1 inHg), and reported flight-level winds of 145 mph (233 km/h). At the time, this was the lowest pressure measured by reconnaissance aircraft over the northern Atlantic Ocean. Because there was little difference in the flight-level winds and the surface winds, this was estimated to have been Gloria's peak intensity, making it a Category 4 on the Saffir-Simpson scale. However, a preliminary reanalysis released in 2008 suggested peak winds of 155 mph (249 km/h). At peak intensity, the hurricane was located about 930 mi (1,500 km) southeast of Cape Hatteras in North Carolina, and had an eye diameter of only 8 mi (13 km).

Hurricane Gloria depicted by the SLOSH model as it approached New England.

After peak intensity, Gloria weakened while turning to the north, moving around the western end of the ridge, toward a cold front. By September 26, the winds had decreased to 90 mph (140 km/h), just 30 hours after its peak intensity. Shortly after peaking, Gloria's asymmetrical wind field caused the storm to rapidly weaken, and 18 hours later, its sustained wind speed decreased to 90 mph (140 km/h). Later that day, a buoy about 60 mi (97 km) east of the center recorded a wave height of 46.9 ft (14.3 m), which at the time was the highest buoy wave recording in an Atlantic hurricane. While accelerating toward North Carolina, Gloria re-intensified slightly to winds of 105 mph (169 km/h), making it a Category 2 hurricane. At 05:30 UTC on September 27, the hurricane struck southern Hatteras Island in the Outer Banks. After weakening further, Gloria passed just east of the Delmarva Peninsula and New Jersey and interacted with a cold front. Its strongest winds remained on the eastern edge of the circulation, and the storm was gradually losing tropical characteristics. At 16:00 UTC on September 27, the hurricane made landfall with a broad and poorly defined center, between John F. Kennedy International Airport and Islip, New York, with sustained winds of 85 mph (137 km/h), on western Long Island. This was only about three days after Henri had struck the same general area as a much weaker tropical storm. Operationally, the NHC had classified Gloria as a Category 3 major hurricane when it made landfall, but the storm's landfall intensity was later downgraded in the post-season analysis. Even then, the hurricane produced Category 3-equivalent wind gusts throughout Long Island.

About an hour after striking Long Island, Gloria made its final landfall in western Connecticut near Westport, and proceeded to move through New England, while weakening. The NHC estimated that Gloria became extratropical over Maine by 00:00 UTC on September 28. The storm continued moving towards the northeast through Atlantic Canada, passing south of Greenland on September 30. The extratropical circulation of Gloria was last noted on October 2, although the storm's remnants later affected Europe and were last noted on October 4.

== Preparations ==
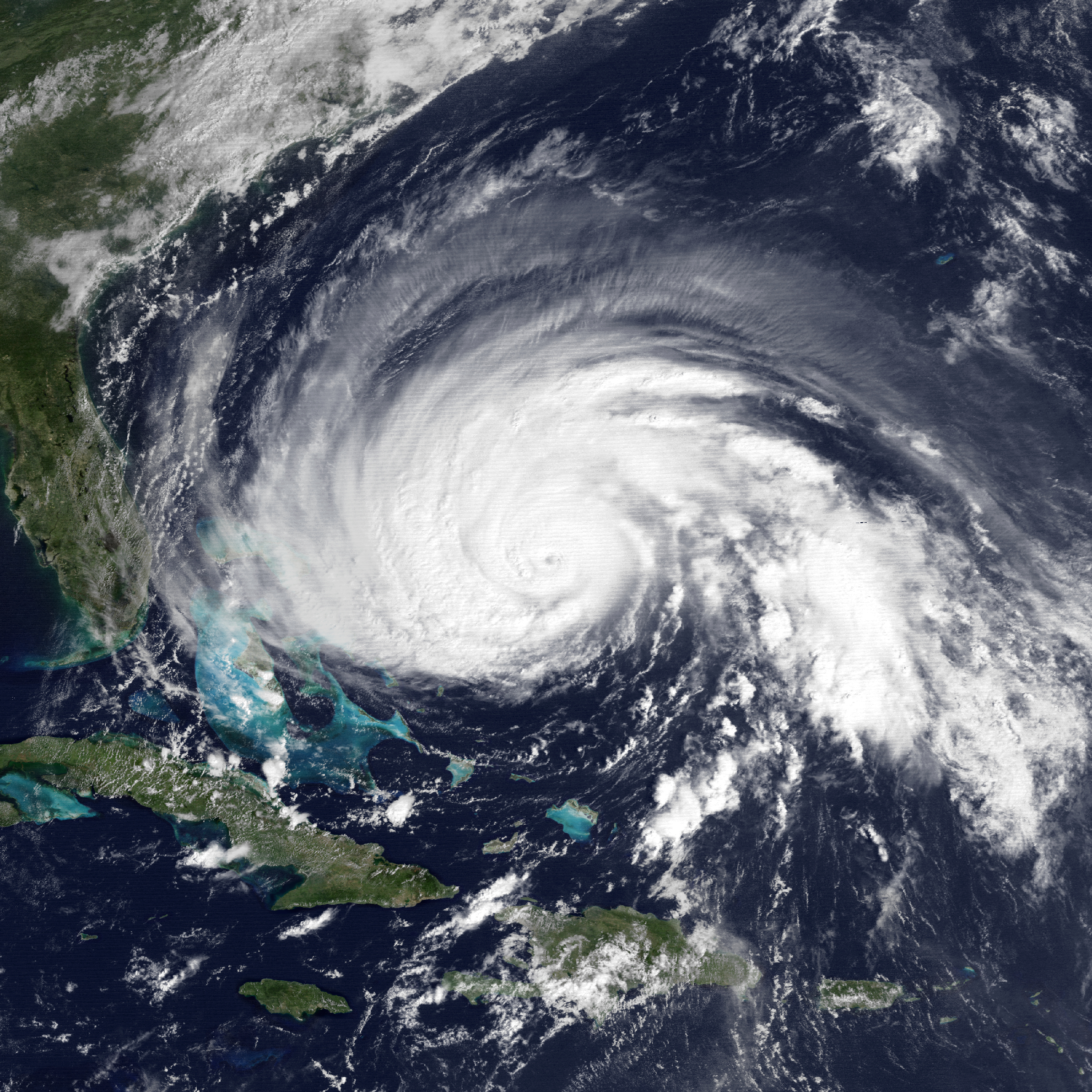
Hurricane Gloria to the east of Florida on September 25

Early in Gloria's duration, it threatened the northern Lesser Antilles, prompting a hurricane watch and later warning for the area. Gloria also threatened the Bahamas, prompting that government to issue hurricane watches and warnings.

While Gloria was off the east coast of Florida, the NHC issued a hurricane watch from Edisto Beach, South Carolina to Cape Henry, Virginia, which was upgraded to a hurricane warning at 1000 UTC on September 26, or 19.5 hours before landfall. By later that day, a hurricane watch was issued for the rest of the eastern United States to Eastport, Maine. By two hours before Gloria's landfall on Long Island, a hurricane warning was in effect for the same area, after warnings were gradually extended further north. Officials anticipated higher winds and storm surge (Note: The storm surge is the difference between the average tide and what occurred during the passage of a hurricane.) than what occurred, due to the hurricane weakening as it approached landfall.

Officials in Delaware and Maryland declared a state of emergency before the storm struck, and thousands of people from coastal communities evacuated to shelters. Schools closed in Delaware, and non-emergency workers were sent home. Along Long Island in New York, hundreds of thousands of people evacuated their homes, and a state of emergency was declared for several counties. In Connecticut, about 20,000 people evacuated along the coast, and 7,300 evacuated from neighboring Rhode Island. Residents also evacuated portions of Cape Cod.

As Gloria approached the East Coast of the United States, National Hurricane Center director Neil Frank called it the "Storm of the Century", due to its intensity and potential track over the densely populated region of New England. Such a track gathered the attention of many people, and led to the evacuation of 380,000 people along the coast from North Carolina to Connecticut. In Maryland, officials implemented lane reversing to expedite the evacuation process, a policy many other coastal states now use.

Officials advised 95,000 citizens along the New Jersey coastline, an area that rarely experiences hurricanes, to evacuate. Cape May County—the most vulnerable part of the state and among the most susceptible in the entire country—would require 36 hours in 2005 to evacuate the 100,000 citizens and 900,000 tourists that were commonly present during busy summer weekends.

Offices and classes of Harvard University closed only for the third time in the 20th century, the previous cases being the New England Hurricane of 1938 and the Blizzard of '78. Although Gloria's winds downed numerous trees and caused tens of thousands of dollars in damage in the area, overall effects were much less than expected.

At the same time Gloria was making landfall on Long Island, a storm warning was issued for western New Brunswick and Nova Scotia. Across Atlantic Canada, the threat of Hurricane Gloria caused many citizens to rely on American media for storm coverage.

== Impact ==
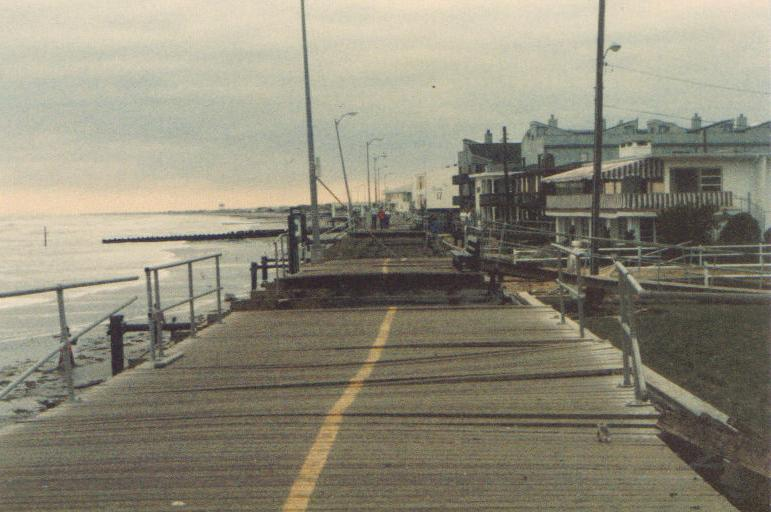
Boardwalk damage in Ocean City, New Jersey

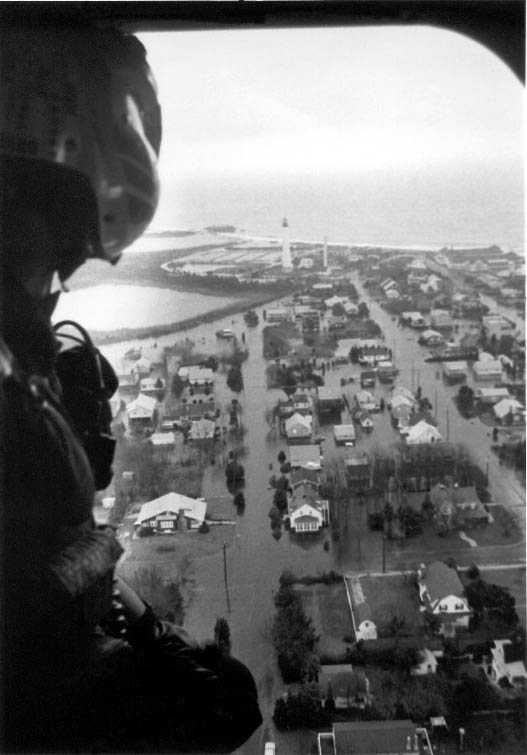
Flooding from Hurricane Gloria in Cape May Point, New Jersey

Hurricane Gloria was a large hurricane that affected much of the northeastern United States. Gloria brought strong wind gusts, which downed trees and left hundreds of thousands without power. Overall damage was estimated at $900 million, and there were fourteen deaths. Gloria was the first significant hurricane to affect New England since Hurricane Donna in 1960.

=== Carolinas and Mid-Atlantic ===
While offshore the eastern United States, the hurricane's strongest winds were on the eastern periphery, which reduced the winds over land. In North Carolina, where Gloria made its first landfall, the strongest winds were 74 mph (119 km/h) at a station near Buxton at the Cape Hatteras National Weather Service office; a gust of 87 mph (140 km/h) was also observed there. At Diamond Shoal Light, located offshore, sustained winds reached 98 mph (158 km/h), with gusts to 120 mph (190 km/h). A peak storm surge of 5.9 ft (1.8 m) was estimated at the Neuse River. A minimal surge of around 1.3 ft (0.4 ft) occurred in neighboring South Carolina, where winds were below tropical storm force. The highest rainfall related to Gloria was 9.7 in (250 mm), recorded in Edenton, North Carolina. High waves and storm surge resulted in heavy coastal flooding and beach erosion along the Outer Banks, and several new inlets were created. Coastal flooding damaged several homes in the Outer Banks. Damage in the state was estimated at $8.1 million, including $2.4 million in crop damage. There was one death in North Carolina when a man was struck by a fallen tree.

Throughout much of the Mid-Atlantic, the winds remained generally below hurricane force; however, gusts reached 92 mph (148 km/h) along the Chesapeake Bay Bridge-Tunnel in Virginia and 89 mph (143 km/h) in Ocean City, Maryland. The strongest winds in the region occurred after the center passed the area. Due to Gloria's fast motion, there was minimal coastal flooding because the highest storm surge occurred during low tide, generally less than 4.9 ft (1.5 m). Beach erosion was reported in both Maryland and Delaware. The heaviest rainfall was west of the center. Statewide peaks included 9.17 in (233 mm) at Valley Forge National Historical Park in Pennsylvania, 8.6 in (220 mm) in Holland, Virginia, and 7.19 in (183 mm) in Annapolis, Maryland. Rainfall spread as far inland as West Virginia.

High waves washed away 30 ft (9.1 m) of a fishing pier in Virginia Beach, Virginia. The rainfall caused minor flooding, and high tides flooded coastal portions of the Hampton Roads region. There was minor damage to trees, roofs, and signs in southeastern Virginia. The center of Gloria passed about 30 mi (48 km) offshore eastern Maryland. In Ocean City, waves of 15 ft (4.6 m) severely damaged the boardwalk, washing sand and debris a block inland. Downed trees left about 150,000 people in Maryland without power. High winds forced the Chesapeake Bay Bridge to close, and there was little damage outside of eastern Maryland. High waves in Delaware eroded beaches, wrecked dunes, and damaged oceanfront buildings and boardwalks. Storm flooding closed several highways, including Delaware Route 1. Damage was heaviest in Sussex County, although the storm damaged corn and soybean crops in northern Delaware. Monetary damage totaled over $500,000 in the state. In neighboring Pennsylvania, wind gusts reached 56 mph (90 km/h) in Allentown, which knocked down many trees and left thousands without power. Heavy rainfall flooded many streams, which closed or damaged several highways, bridges, and rail lines. About 3,000 houses were flooded, forcing thousands to evacuate.

While just off the New Jersey coast, Gloria produced strong winds, peaking at 81 mph (130 km/h) in Ocean City, where a gust of 101 mph (163 km/h) was also reported. In the town, an F0 tornado was reported damaging a house. Rainfall in the state reached 6.00 in (152 mm) at the Charlotteburg Reservoir near West Milford. Heavy beach erosion occurred along the coast, and several coastal towns sustained damage to boardwalks. Strong winds downed trees and power lines, which damaged homes and cars. One person was killed in Long Branch after touching a downed power line.

Though Gloria moved quickly through the region, it dropped moderate rainfall in locations, including 6.04 inches (153 mm) at Baltimore–Washington International Airport. In addition, some unofficial reports in southeastern Virginia indicated amounts of up to 8 inches (200 mm) of rain. Because much of the Mid-Atlantic experienced the western, weaker side of this hurricane, damage was relatively light. High winds downed numerous trees throughout the area, leaving hundreds of thousands without power, including 237,000 in New Jersey, 124,000 in Maryland, and 56,000 in Virginia. Extreme rainfall in Virginia resulted in $5.5 million (1985 USD) in damage. Intense flood waters split Long Beach Island in half for a period of time.

=== Long Island and New York City ===
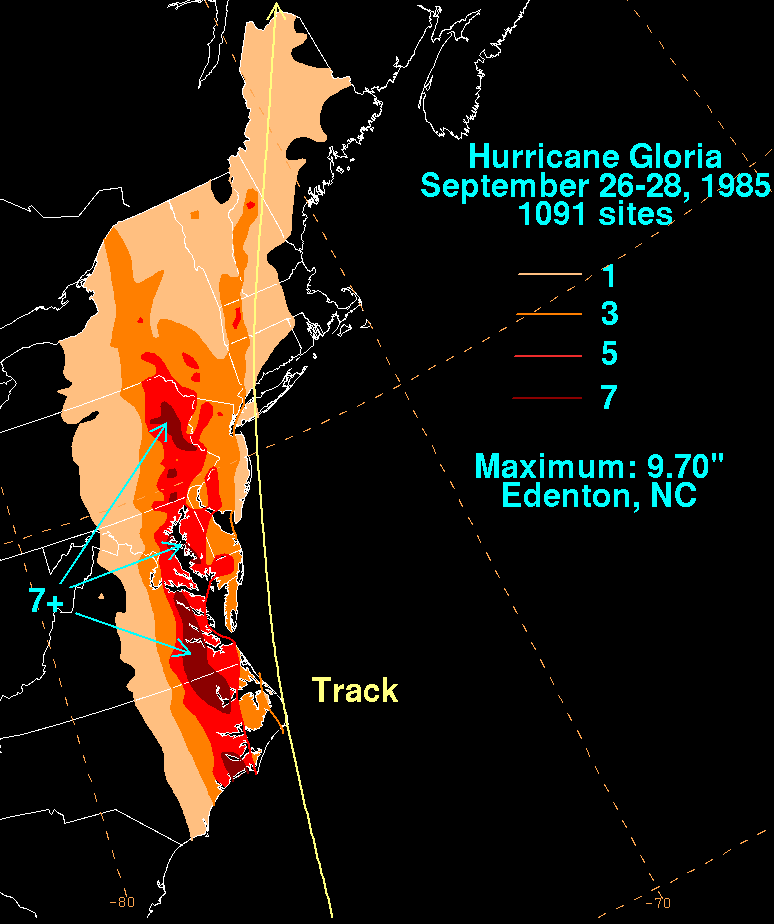
Rainfall totals related to Hurricane Gloria

While making its second landfall, Gloria was accompanied by a storm surge of 6.9 ft (2.1 m) at Battery Park, the highest along its path. The highest wind report was a gust of 85 mph (137 km/h) at Islip Airport. Central Park reported a gust of 51 mph (82 km/h). Rainfall in the state reached 8.04 in (204 mm) at Unadilla, although was much less near the coast, reaching 3.48 in (88 mm) in Central Park.

Along Long Island, the high storm surge flooded hundreds of streets and caused heavy beach erosion. High winds downed thousands of trees and damaged hundreds of homes, causing widespread power outages. About 1.5 million people in the state lost power, including two-thirds of the Long Island Lighting Company customers, making it one of the worst power outages in the state. Storm surges reached 7.0 ft (2.1 m) at Bergen Point and the Battery, and 4.5 ft (1.4 m) at Willets Point; these effects were mitigated by Gloria's fast motion and arrival at low tide. Had Gloria moved more slowly and struck at high tide, the storm surge at the Battery would have been 9.8 ft (3.0 m), a record for the location; storm surges at Bergen Point and Willets Point would have been 10 and 8.4 ft (3.0 and 2.6 m), respectively. There were four deaths on Long Island, two of whom related to heart attacks and the other two related to fallen trees. There were also 14 injuries in the region, many of them due to downed tree branches. In the New York mainland, heavy rainfall flooded rivers and alleviated drought conditions. Rough waves damaged boats and docks along the Hudson River. Unsettled weather contributed to a traffic fatality and an airplane crash that killed one in the New York mainland.

It is believed peak gusts reached 115 mph (185 km/h) in eastern Long Island. Weather forecasters believe that damage across parts of Long Island indicated winds in the Category 3 range, as evidence of the damage received at MacArthur Airport. Gloria's high winds caused significant damage across Long Island and southeastern New York. The area hit the worst was eastern Long Island, where high wind gusts blew thousands of trees into buildings and across roads. The broadcast tower of WBLI-FM toppled on Bald Hill in Farmingville. In addition, the winds ripped roofs off of many buildings, including hangars at the MacArthur Airport, a hangar at the Bayport Aerodrome and the roof of the Islip Police Station. Prolonged exposure to high winds and waves led to moderate beach erosion, washing away several piers and docks. The storm surge, though relatively weak, destroyed 48 houses on the ocean side of the island. Gloria's high winds left 683,000 people in New York without power, with some lacking electricity for over eleven days.

=== New England and Canada ===
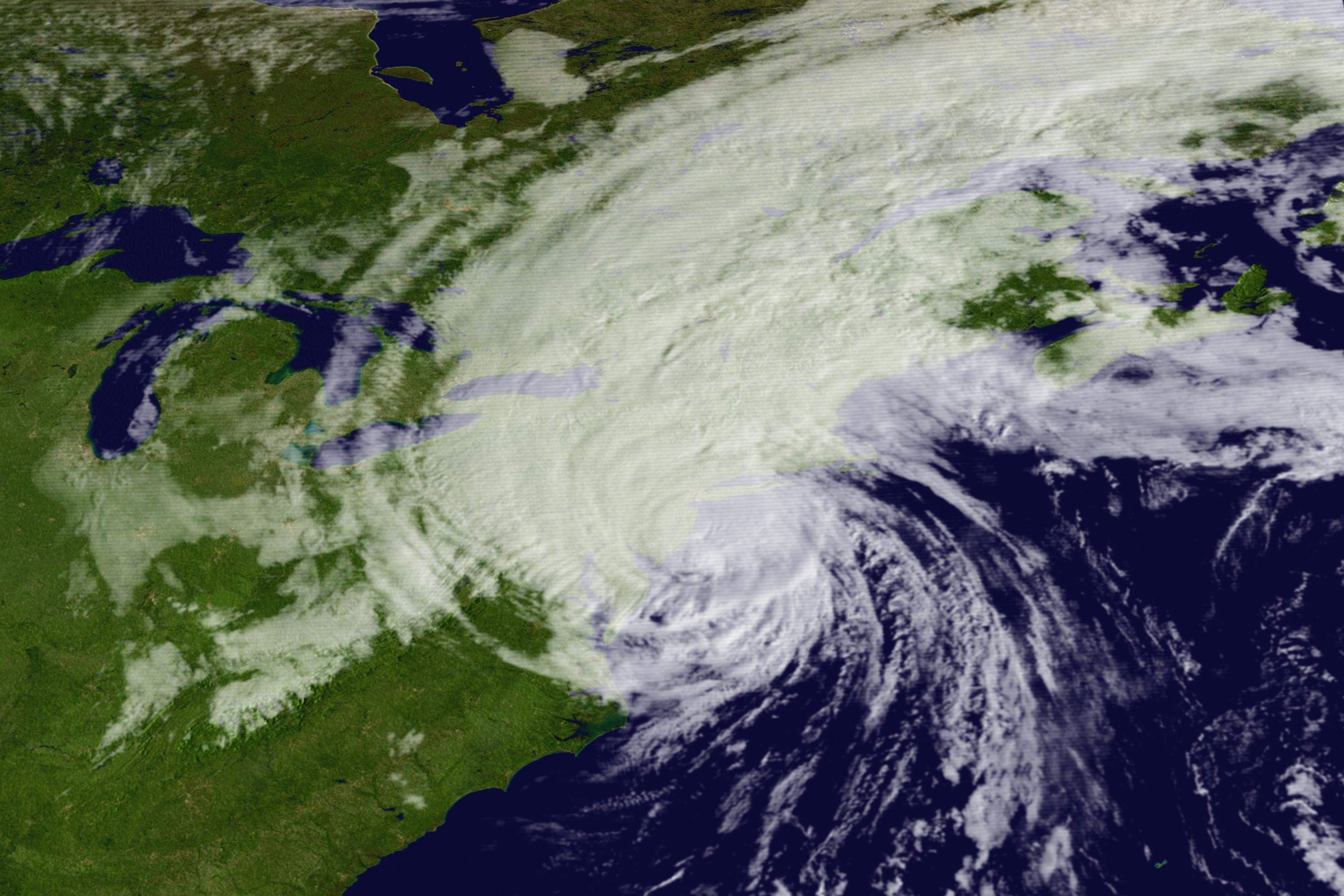
Satellite image of Hurricane Gloria making landfall on New England

Gloria passed quickly through New England as a weakened hurricane, although it maintained a large circulation. The storm hit at low tide, resulting in low to moderate storm surges of 5 feet (1.5 m) in Groton, Connecticut, 6 feet (1.8 m) in New Bedford, Massachusetts, and 3 feet (0.91 m) in Portland, Maine. The high waves caused heavy beach erosion in Connecticut and Rhode Island. The highest reported sustained winds were 83 mph (134 km/h) in Waterbury, Connecticut, and Blue Hill Meteorological Observatory in Massachusetts, although neither location is at sea level. Gusts peaked at 110 mph (180 km/h) in Chatham, Massachusetts, and widespread areas across New England reported hurricane-force gusts. It is estimated that hurricane-force winds occurred in Connecticut, Massachusetts, and New Hampshire. Rainfall in the region peaked at 6.90 in (175 mm) at Borden Brook Reservoir in Springfield, Massachusetts.

In Connecticut, Gloria crossed from Westport along Long Island Sound, passed near Hartford, and exited into Massachusetts. Wind gusts peaked at 92 mph (148 km/h) in Bridgeport, and 82 mph (132 km/h) in Hartford. The winds downed thousands of trees, many of which knocked down power lines. This left about 727,000 residents without power, setting a record for the state related to a weather event. High waves damaged or sunk hundreds of boats along the coast, and several beachfront homes and docks were damaged. Light rainfall caused some minor flooding, mostly in northwestern Connecticut. Agricultural damage across the state totaled about $6 million. Damage was heaviest near Hartford, and overall storm damage was estimated at $91 million. Fallen trees contributed to two of the three deaths in the state, as well as several other injuries.

Hurricane-force gusts affected coastal Rhode Island, peaking at 92 mph (148 km/h) in Westerly. The winds uprooted thousands of trees and caused widespread roof damage. About 300,000 people lost power; this constituted the largest power outage in the state since the Northeast blackout of 1965. Coastal flooding was minimized due to the storm striking at low tide, although tides were high enough in Narragansett Bay to damage docks and hundreds of boats. Damage in the state was estimated at $20 million, including the cost for restoring the power outages. There were two deaths in Rhode Island; one was related to a fallen tree, and one occurred when a man was trying to secure his boat.

In Massachusetts, the hurricane moved from Connecticut through the Springfield area. There was a small F1 tornado in Middlesex County that damaged trees. High winds knocked over thousands of trees, and about 500,000 people statewide lost power. At the Arnold Arboretum of Harvard University in Boston, a total of approximately 95 trees were lost and another 100 were damaged at a cost of over $100,000; these impacts were generally less severe than expected, as Gloria had been forecast to track closer to Boston than it ultimately did. Heavy rainfall caused stream flooding, although the heaviest damage was from the winds. The hurricane destroyed a radio tower in Framingham and damaged hundreds of homes in the eastern portion of the state. Along the coast, the storm tide caused minor coastal flooding and damaged hundreds of boats. Across Massachusetts, damage was estimated at $61 million, including $6 million from crop damage.

By the time Gloria reached New Hampshire, it had weakened and was becoming extratropical, although hurricane-force wind gusts were reported across the state. On the top of Mount Washington, wind gusts reached 127 mph (204 km/h). The winds were strong enough to knock down large trees, 100,000 people lost power, mostly along the coast. Fallen trees also damaged 16 homes and several vehicles. North Woodstock reported generally minor damage from rainfall-induced flooding. There was one death in the state; an elderly woman was knocked over by the strong winds, and died two weeks later. There was about $2.5 million in crop damage, mostly to the apple crop. In neighboring Maine, about 600,000 people lost power due to the storm; this was the most since the passage of hurricanes Carol and Edna in 1954. Wind gusts in Maine reached 86 mph (138 km/h), and the storm knocked down about 100 power poles in addition to the downed lines. Downed trees blocked roads and damaged houses and cars. The winds damaged roofs, including the 127‑year‑old spire of a church in Groveville. Damage to the apple crop was estimated at $3 million. High waves along the coast damaged lobster traps and dozens of boats, many of which were driven ashore.

Gloria's high winds downed numerous trees across New England, causing minor to moderate damage. In the region, Connecticut received the worst damage to trees and structures. Along the coastline, storm surge and strong waves washed away several fishing piers, and some roadways were underwater during the storm's passage. New Hampshire was affected only slightly from the hurricane; effects were limited to minor wind damage and localized flooding. In Maine, damage was more severe, where strong wind gusts ripped off roofs and uprooted hundreds of trees. High winds across New England resulted in significant power outages, leaving 250,000 in Maine without power. In all, seven deaths occurred in New England, many of which occurred from falling tree limbs.

While the remnants of Gloria were moving through Atlantic Canada, they produced rainfall to the north of the track, reaching as high as 4.53 in (115 mm) in Quebec. The highest winds in the country were 58 mph (93 km/h), peaking in the Bay of Fundy and to the northeast of Newfoundland. The remnants of Gloria caused wind and wave damage in Nova Scotia. Wind gusts of 55 mph (89 km/h) in Fredericton, New Brunswick knocked down power lines, affecting more than 1,800 people.

=== Western Europe ===
In Western Europe, Gloria's remnants produced unusual weather over portions of the region. On October 4, Gloria's remnants caused the warmest October day on record for Switzerland during the 20th century.

== Aftermath ==
On Long Island, thousands were left without power for over a week, until the last outages were restored two weeks after the storm on October 8. The long duration without electricity forced hundreds of schools to close, extended train times by six hours due to lack of powered crossings, and price gouging on food, ice, and generators. The lack of power led to a general disdain for the Long Island Lighting Company (LILCO), which increased further when the company left the $40 million (1985 USD) repair bill to the ratepayers, citing the company's lack of hurricane insurance. Citizens quickly protested LILCO's decision, and within years the publicly owned Long Island Power Authority was formed.

Residents in both Massachusetts and Connecticut were also without power for up to two weeks. The states brought in workers from other states, although the delay in restoring the widespread outages caused many schools to remain closed. In Connecticut, one man was electrocuted while repairing downed power lines. About 477,000 Connecticut Light & Power customers in the state lost power, a record that was surpassed by the 754,000 who lost power during Hurricane Irene in 2011. Later in 2011, a nor'easter in October left over 830,000 people statewide without power, also breaking the record set by Gloria. In New Hampshire, most power outages were quickly restored, and all were restored within six days. In Maine, all power outages were restored in 11 days.

After the storm, President Ronald Reagan declared several counties in New Jersey, Pennsylvania, New York, Rhode Island, Connecticut, and Massachusetts as federal disaster areas. This declaration allowed those counties to apply for disaster assistance.

In Canada, the damage was less than expected, but confusion related to the storm threat prompted Environment Canada to research the need for a dedicated hurricane center in 1986. The following year, the Canadian Hurricane Centre was established with offices on both the Atlantic and Pacific coasts.

Due to the hurricane's impact, the World Meteorological Organization retired name Gloria from the rotating Atlantic tropical storm naming lists in the spring of 1986, and it will never again be used in the basin. It was replaced with Grace for the 1991 season.

== See also ==
- List of retired Atlantic hurricane names
- List of wettest tropical cyclones in Massachusetts
- List of New England hurricanes
- List of New York hurricanes
- List of New Jersey hurricanes
- List of North Carolina hurricanes
