= Lawson Island =

Island in Nunavut, Canada

- Location within Nunavut Location within Canada

Geography
- Location: Confluence of Hudson Strait and the Labrador Sea
- Coordinates: 60°37′N 64°40′W
- Archipelago: Arctic Archipelago
- Area: 20 km^{2} (7.7 sq mi)
- Coastline: 31 km (19.3 mi)
- Highest elevation: 255 m (837 ft)
- Highest point: Button Hill

Administration
- Canada
- Nunavut: Nunavut
- Region: Qikiqtaaluk

Demographics
- Population: Uninhabited
- Ethnic groups: Inuit
- Source: Lawson Island at Atlas of Canada

Lawson Island is one of the many uninhabited Canadian arctic islands in Qikiqtaaluk Region, Nunavut. It is located at the confluence of Hudson Strait and the Labrador Sea.

The island, a member of the Button Islands, is situated in the northeast part of the grouping, south-southwest of Lacy Island. It is the largest of the Button Islands. Other islands in the immediate vicinity include Holdridge Island, King Island, Leading Island, MacColl Island, and Observation Island.

Lawson Island's summit, Button Hill, rises to 255 m (837 ft) on its eastern side. Minto Anchorage is on the island's southwestern side and provides good anchorage in 36.6 m (120 ft) gravel and clay.
