= Button Islands =

Island group in Nunavut, Canada

- Location within Nunavut Location within Canada

Geography
- Location: Hudson Strait
- Coordinates: 60°38′04″N 64°42′25″W
- Archipelago: Arctic Archipelago
- Area: 51 km^{2} (20 sq mi)
- Coastline: 111 km (69 mi)
- Highest point: 290 m (950 ft) on Lacy Island

Administration
- Canada
- Nunavut: Nunavut
- Region: Qikiqtaaluk

Demographics
- Population: Uninhabited
- Source: Button Islands at the Atlas of Canada

The Button Islands are located in the Arctic Archipelago in the territory of Nunavut. They are surrounded by Ungava Bay, Hudson Strait, Davis Strait, and they are on the north side of Gray Strait. The Button Islands measure 51 km^{2} (20 sq mi).

The Button Islands consist of two groupings of islands lying in a northeast–southwest direction. They are barren, long, and narrow. The two groups are separated by a 0.2 mi (0.32 km) navigable channel. A passage that can be entered from either ends flows through the Button Islands' midsection, measuring 0.2 mi (0.32 km) to 0.6 mi (0.97 km) wide. The mid-channel depth is approximately 3.7 m (12 ft) towards the northeast end.

One grouping includes Lacy Island, Lawson Island, Goodwin Island, and MacColl Island. The other includes Erhardt Island, Clark Island, King Island, Holdridge Island, Leading Island, Niels Island, and Dolphin Island.

The smaller Knight Islands are about 5 km (3.1 mi) to the southeast. The Cape Chidley Islands are 28.2 km (17.5 mi) away.
