= Hurricane Larry =

Category 3 Atlantic hurricane in 2021

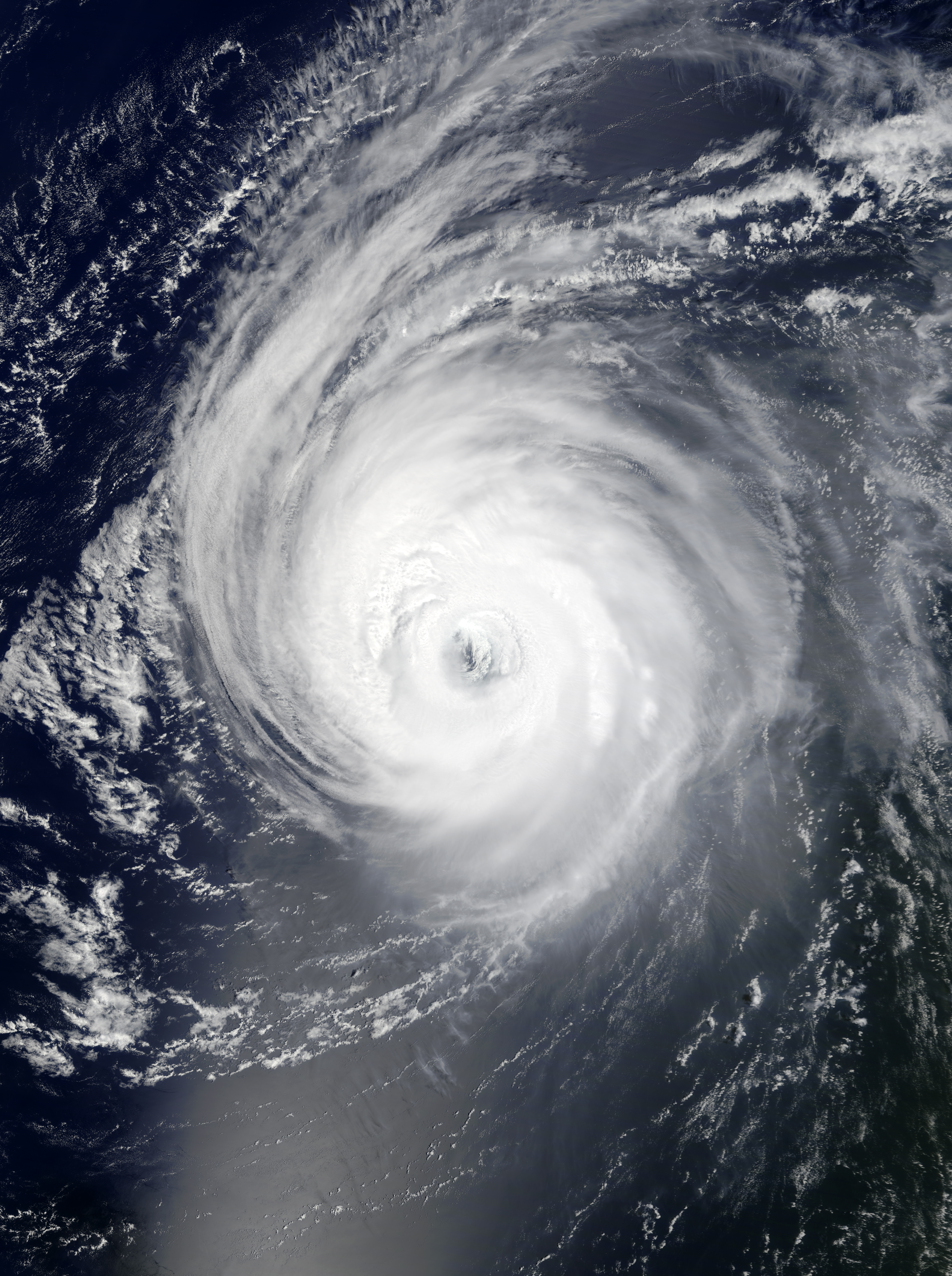
- Hurricane Larry near peak intensity in the open Atlantic Ocean, on September 5

Meteorological history
- Formed: August 31, 2021
- Extratropical: September 11, 2021
- Dissipated: September 12, 2021

Category 3 major hurricane
- 1-minute sustained (SSHWS/NWS)
- Highest winds: 125 mph (205 km/h)
- Lowest pressure: 953 mbar (hPa); 28.14 inHg

Overall effects
- Fatalities: 5 total
- Missing: 1
- Damage: $61 million (2021 USD)
- Areas affected: Lesser Antilles, Bermuda, United States East Coast, Canada, Nova Scotia, Newfoundland, Saint Pierre and Miquelon, Greenland
- IBTrACS
- Part of the 2021 Atlantic hurricane season

Hurricane Larry was a strong and long-lived tropical cyclone that became the first hurricane to make landfall in Newfoundland since Igor in 2010. The twelfth named storm, fifth hurricane, and third major hurricane (Note: Hurricanes reaching Category 3 (111 miles per hour or 179 kilometers per hour) and higher on the five-level Saffir–Simpson wind speed scale are considered major hurricanes.) of the 2021 Atlantic hurricane season, Larry originated from a tropical wave that emerged off the coast of Africa and organized into a tropical depression on August 31. The next day, the depression developed into a tropical storm, receiving the name Larry. The storm moved quickly across the far eastern tropical Atlantic, where it strengthened into a Category 1 hurricane the morning of September 2. Then, after undergoing a period of rapid intensification, Larry became a major Category 3 hurricane early on September 4. After churning for several days as a strong hurricane in the open ocean, and passing near Bermuda, Larry made landfall in Newfoundland on September 11, as a Category 1 hurricane, becoming an extratropical cyclone later that same day. On September 13, the storm was absorbed by a larger extratropical cyclone near Greenland.

Larry passed to the east of Bermuda as a Category 1 hurricane, causing minimal damage. Swells generated by Larry's powerful and expansive wind field killed three people offshore the East Coast of the United States, one off the coast of Puerto Rico, and another in the U.S. Virgin Islands. Another person went missing at sea south of Newfoundland when their stolen boat sailed directly into the storm. In Newfoundland, Larry caused over 60,000 power outages and damaged buildings. Its powerful extratropical remnants paralleled the eastern coast of Greenland on September 12, resulting in over 4 ft (1.2 m) of snow and hurricane-force wind gusts across much of the interior of eastern Greenland. A report by Catastrophe Indices and Quantification Inc. (CATIQ) stated that Larry killed five people and caused an estimated CA$25 million (US$20 million) in insurance loss from damage. According to Aon Benfield, total damage in Canada reached US$61 million.

== Meteorological history ==
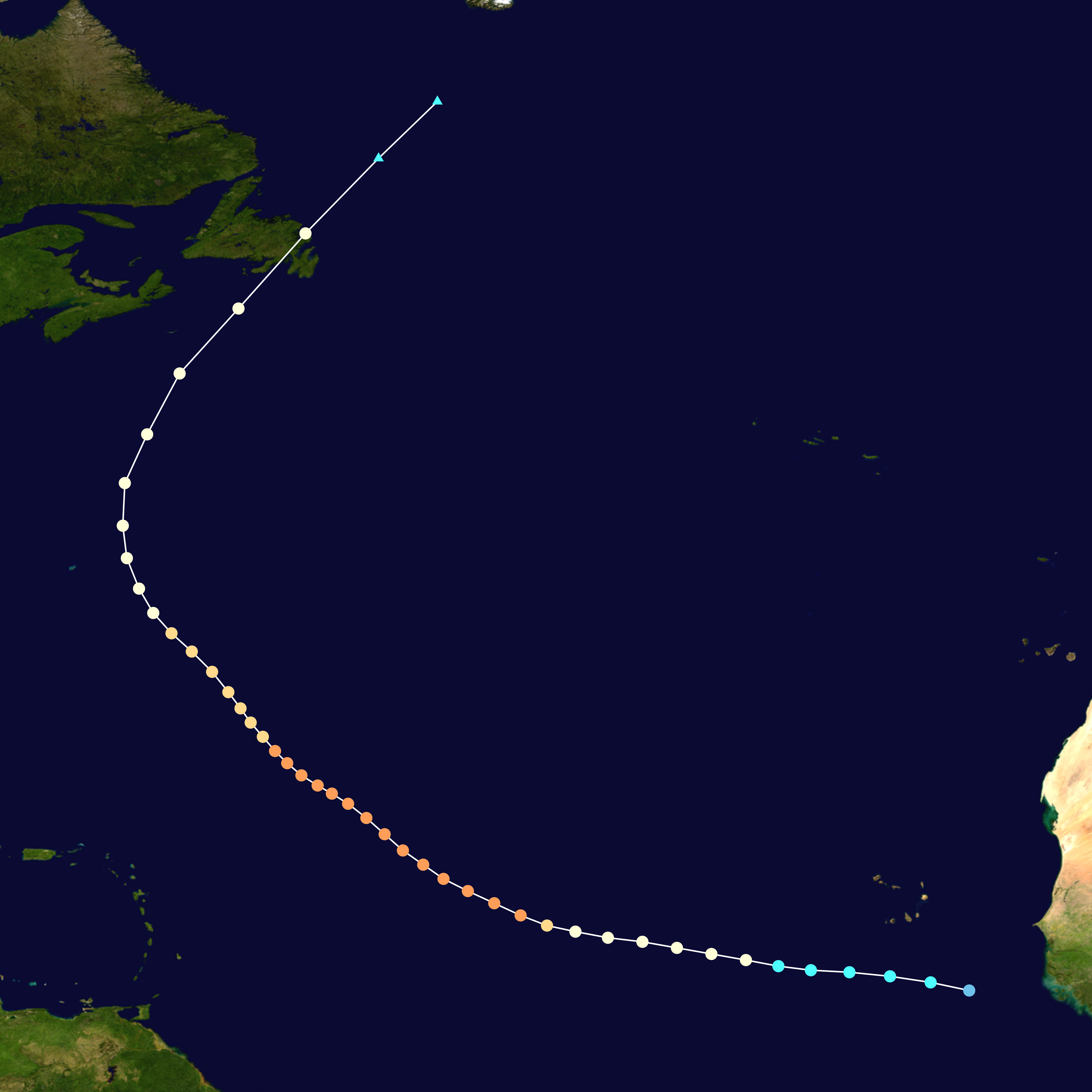
Map plotting the storm's track and intensity, according to the Saffir–Simpson scale Map key Saffir–Simpson scale Tropical depression (≤38 mph, ≤62 km/h) Tropical storm (39–73 mph, 63–118 km/h) Category 1 (74–95 mph, 119–153 km/h) Category 2 (96–110 mph, 154–177 km/h) Category 3 (111–129 mph, 178–208 km/h) Category 4 (130–156 mph, 209–251 km/h) Category 5 (≥157 mph, ≥252 km/h) Unknown Storm type Tropical cyclone Subtropical cyclone Extratropical cyclone, remnant low, tropical disturbance, or monsoon depression

On August 27, the National Hurricane Center (NHC) was monitoring a tropical wave that was going to emerge off the coast of West Africa, giving it a 20% chance of formation for the next five days. The tropical wave exited Africa on August 30, associated with an area of low pressure moving generally westward. In the following 24 hours, deep convection began to quickly develop around the eastern portion of the low-pressure area. Due to this, the NHC designated the system as a tropical depression at 18:00 UTC on August 31, numbering it Twelve, while it was situated 320 miles (520 kilometres) south-southeast of the Cape Verde Islands. Six hours later, the depression became a tropical storm, receiving the name Larry. The storm moved generally westward over the next few days, directly to the south of the edge of the subtropical ridge, steadily strengthening due to favorable conditions such as low wind shear, high moisture levels, and high sea surface temperatures. The storm underwent some strengthening on September 1, with a small inner-core forming that afternoon.

At 06:00 UTC on September 2, Larry developed a well-defined mid-level eye, and strengthened to winds of 75 mph (120 km/h) with a pressure of 991 hPa (29.26 inHg), sufficient for the NHC to classify Larry as a hurricane. Later on September 2, Larry, in the process of an eyewall replacement cycle, encountered wind shear and dry mid-level air, and its intensification paused briefly, disturbing the process. Larry quickly recovered from this, and early the next day it underwent a period of rapid intensification, the fourth hurricane of the season to do so, intensifying by 45 mph (70 km/h) in a 24-hour period. At 12:00 UTC, Larry developed a well-defined eye that was visible on satellite imagery, and at 00:00 UTC the next day, Larry became a Category 3 major hurricane. Six hours later, Larry reached its peak intensity of 125 mph (205 km/h), while located 1,000 mi (1,610 km) east of the Leeward Islands, then began to turn west-northwestward, slowing down under the influence of the subtropical ridge.

On the afternoon of September 4, Larry underwent another eyewall replacement cycle and decreased slightly in intensity, although remaining at Category 3 strength. By the morning of September 5, the storm had gained annular characteristics, specifically an eye that had doubled in size, from 20 mi (30 km) in diameter to 50 mi (80 km). Overnight, Larry had also strengthened back to 125 mph (205 km/h), its second peak intensity, located 835 miles (1,345 kilometres) east of the Leeward Islands. Early on September 6, Larry weakened again, while maintaining annular features. At 12:00 UTC on September 7, Larry weakened to 110 mph (175 km/h), becoming a Category 2 hurricane. It had also reached the western edge of the subtropical ridge by then, and started moving more sharply to the north, over the central Atlantic. By September 8, Larry had grown to a large size; with a tropical-storm-force wind radius of 230 miles (370 kilometres). Larry would maintain Category 2 status until it got downgraded to a Category 1 hurricane on September 9, with winds of 90 mph (150 km/h), due to slowly decreasing sea surface temperatures. Turning north-northwestward, late on 9 September, Larry reached its westernmost point 150 miles (240 kilometres) east-northeast of Bermuda.

Early on September 10, Larry started moving north, and began to accelerate due to the presence of a mid-latitude trough. Increasing wind shear and decreasing sea surface temperatures caused Larry to weaken further, and at 12:00 UTC on September 10, it reached 80 mph (130 km/h). Then Larry turned to the north-northeast and its forward speed increased to 35 mph (55 km/h) as it passed within 230 miles (370 kilometres) of Nova Scotia. (Note: The forward speed of a tropical cyclone is the speed at which it moves.) By 00:00 UTC on September 11, Larry's speed had increased to 45 mph (75 km/h) as it approached the southeastern coast of Newfoundland. At 03:30 UTC on September 11, the storm made landfall in Great Bona Cove, east of the Burin Peninsula on Newfoundland's south coast as a Category 1 hurricane with sustained winds of 80 mph (130 km/h) and a minimum central pressure of 960 millibars (28 inHg). Once Larry made landfall, it further weakened to 75 mph (120 km/h) at 06:00 UTC on September 11, while over Newfoundland. By 12:00 UTC, Larry had passed Newfoundland and transitioned into a large 70 mph (110 km/h) extratropical cyclone 370 miles (590 kilometres) north-northeast of St. John's, Newfoundland. Extratropical Cyclone Larry weakened slightly before, at 00:00 UTC on September 12, it was absorbed by another extratropical cyclone moving east in the Labrador Sea, causing hurricane-force winds in Greenland.

== Preparations and impact ==
=== Bermuda ===
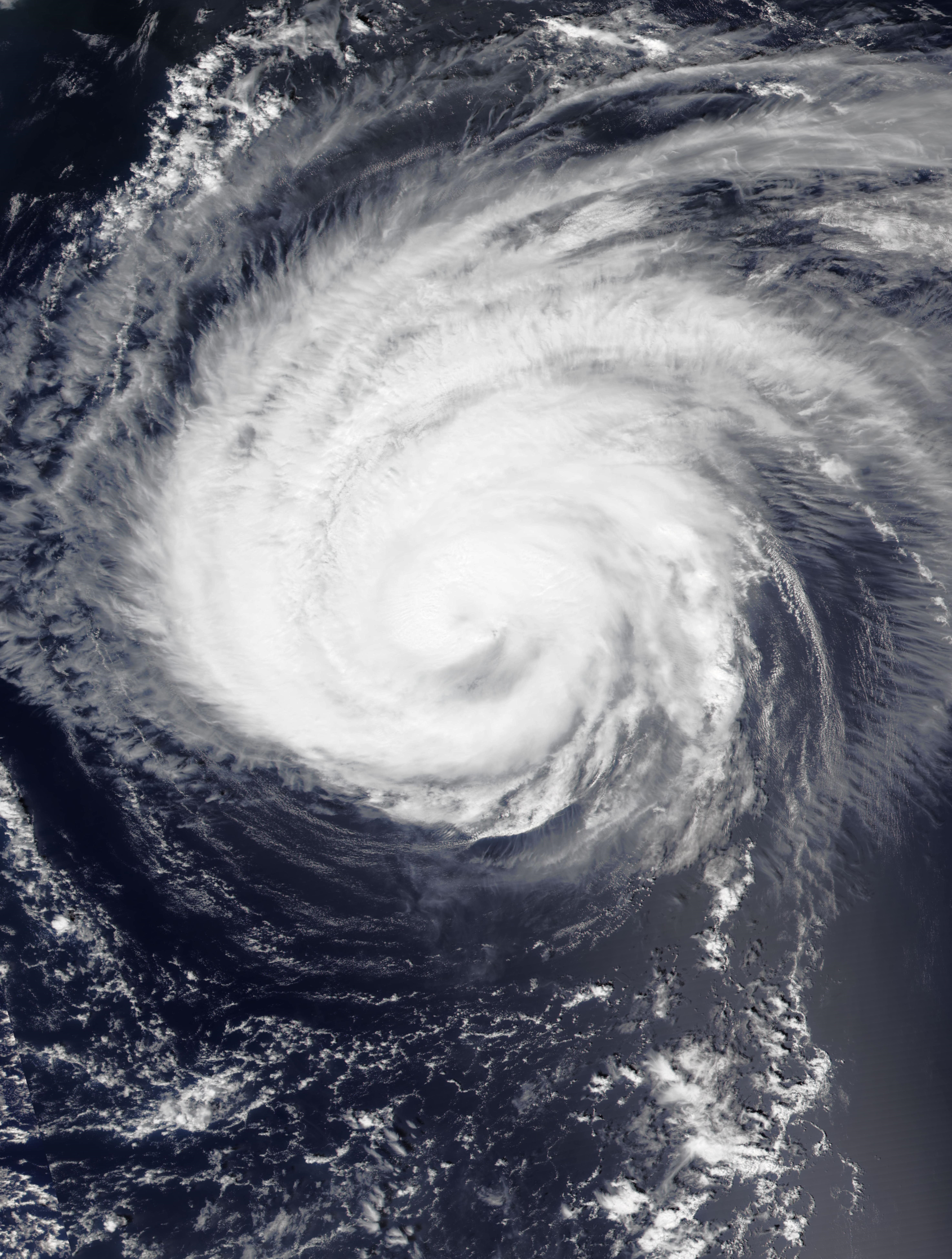
Hurricane Larry passing to the east of Bermuda on September 9

At 15:00 UTC on September 7, the Bermuda Weather Service issued a tropical storm watch as tropical storm conditions were possible. The following day at 12:00 UTC, the watch was upgraded to a warning. At 00:00 UTC, September 9, the Bermuda Weather Service discontinued the warning. That same day, Larry brought tropical storm-force winds to the island, with sustained winds of 74 km/h (46 mph) and gusts up to 85 km/h (53 mph), a minimum overland pressure of 1004 hPa (29.65 inHg) and a storm surge of 0.20 metres (0.67 ft) being recorded at Ferry Reach. No deaths were recorded, and overall damage was minimal, consisting only of storm surge to beaches and one minor power outage due to fallen trees.

=== United States ===
Although Larry remained far away from the United States and its territories, large swells from the hurricane reached the East Coast, as well as Puerto Rico and the U.S. Virgin Islands. Rip currents killed a woman in Saint Croix on September 8 and a man in Puerto Rico on September 11. In Florida, the National Weather Service issued a rip current warning for beach areas. In Cape Canaveral, a 69-year-old man drowned due to rip currents. On September 8, a 68-year-old man drowned offshore a beach in South Carolina. A 23-year-old man was caught in a rip current off the Virginia coast and died.

=== Canada ===
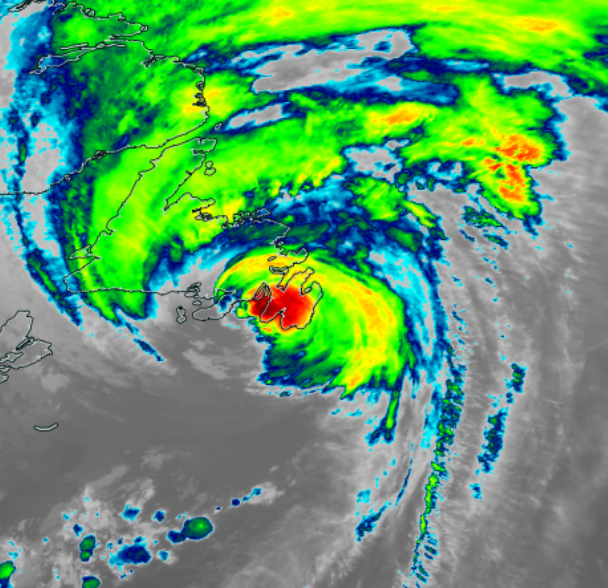
Larry making landfall in Newfoundland on September 11 at 3 UTC

Larry passed south of Nova Scotia on the way to Newfoundland. On the evening of September 10, an emergency position-indicating radio beacon (EPIRB) from a yacht, Secret Plans, stolen earlier in the week in Halifax was activated more than 600 km (370 mi) southeast of Halifax. Wind gusts of over 110 km/h (70 mph) and seas of up to 15 m (50 ft) were reported in the area at the time. Resources were dispatched from the United States Coast Guard rescue co-ordination centre in Boston and the Joint Rescue Coordination Centre Halifax. Flares were seen but no trace was ever found of the vessel or the person believed to have been on board, an Antiguan man who had been arrested for smuggling cocaine into Canada via sailboat, and had recently escaped from custody and disappeared. The search was called off on 12 September.

In Newfoundland, St. John's International Airport recorded sustained winds of 96 km/h (60 mph) and a gust of 145 km/h (90 mph) just after 05:30 UTC, while Cape St. Mary's Lighthouse reported a gust of 182 km/h (113 mph) before ceasing transmission. The waves reached heights of 3.6 m (12 ft) in Argentia and the tide gauge showed a maximum water level about 150 cm (4.9 ft) higher than normal. The storm surge coincided with a high tide, exacerbating coastal flooding. This caused the coastal town of Little Bay on the Burin Peninsula of Newfoundland's south coast to be evacuated. Due to Larry's fast movement, rainfall was less severe than expected. It rained from 25 to 35 mm (0.98 to 1.38 in) in a very short time over southeastern Newfoundland, with the highest recorded rain from Larry being 38 mm (1.5 in) in Port Rexton.

In the eastern part of the province, Larry left 61,000 people without power. Trees were uprooted and branches were littered across the ground. The Mary Queen of Peace Elementary School in St. John's was severely damaged due to high winds. The performance tent near Quidi Vidi Lake, set up for the Iceberg Alley concert festival, suffered significant damage, and a show scheduled for September 10 was cancelled in advance of Larry. Mayor Danny Breen confirmed that the hurricane caused a significant amount of damage around St. John's. The Newfoundland and Labrador Department of Transportation and Infrastructure asked motorists to avoid the area of Highway 90 in the southern Avalon Peninsula because a section was damaged. Numerous activities in the affected area and some flights at St. John's International Airport were canceled or postponed. St. Clare's Mercy Hospital lost power during the storm, leading them to temporarily stop visitations. Advance polls for the 2021 Canadian federal election were suspended in parts of St. John's.

In Lord's Cove, near Saint-Pierre-et-Miquelon, damage was caused to the infrastructure, including to the wharf, the seawall, and the causeway. At North Harbour, a kilometre-long stretch of the main road was washed out by large waves and storm surge. Over 90,000 salmon at an aquaculture facility off the south coast of Newfoundland died after concentrations of dissolved oxygen fell significantly while Larry passed over the area. A report by the Catastrophe Indices and Quantification (CATIQ) stated that the insurance loss was about CA$25 million (US$20 million).

=== Greenland ===
In Greenland, ex-Larry was one of the few storms from the remnants of a tropical cyclone to pass so far north. It caused up to 120 cm (4 feet) of snow, with some places along the coast receiving a rainfall equivalent. On September 12, gusts of 161 km/h (100 mph) were reported at Kulusuk airport, near the southeast coast of the island. In Tasiilaq, sustained winds reached 89 km/h (55 mph) and gusts of over 145 km/h (90 mph). Wind and snow caused a blizzard at Summit Camp, a weather station located on the ice sheet over 3,200 m (10,500 ft) above sea level. This occurred less than a month after Summit Camp recorded their first rain on record, and partially replenished snow cover lost during the melt season.

== See also ==
- Other storms of the same name
- Weather of 2021
- Tropical cyclones in 2021
- List of Category 3 Atlantic hurricanes
- List of Newfoundland hurricanes
- Hurricane Gert (1999) – A category 4 hurricane that took a similar path.
- Hurricane Erin (2001) – A category 3 hurricane that took a similar path in September 2001.
- Hurricane Igor (2010) – A category 4 hurricane that took a nearly identical track.
- Hurricane Teddy (2020) – A category 4 hurricane that took a similar path in September 2020.
- Hurricane Sam (2021) – A high-end category 4 hurricane that took a similar path two weeks later.
