= List of storms named Larry =

The name Larry has been used for three tropical cyclones worldwide, two in the Atlantic Ocean and one the Australian region of the Pacific Ocean.

In the Atlantic:

- Tropical Storm Larry (2003) – an erratic storm that made landfall at Paraíso, Tabasco
- Hurricane Larry (2021) – a large and long-lived hurricane that made landfall in Newfoundland

In the Australian region:

- Cyclone Larry (2006) – a severe tropical cyclone that made landfall near Innisfail, Queensland, and caused roughly AU$1.5 billion (US$1.1 billion) in damage

After 2006, the name Larry was retired in Australian region.

== See also ==
- Northeastern United States blizzard of 1978 – initially known as Storm Larry in Connecticut
- November 2024 Northeast Pacific bomb cyclone, nicknamed Cyclone Larry by NWS Las Vegas
