= MacColl Island =

Island in Nunavut, Canada

- Location within Nunavut Location within Canada

Geography
- Location: Confluence of Hudson Strait and the Labrador Sea
- Coordinates: 60°38′N 64°42′W
- Archipelago: Arctic Archipelago
- Area: 15 km^{2} (5.8 sq mi)
- Coastline: 26 km (16.2 mi)
- Highest elevation: 152 m (499 ft)

Administration
- Canada
- Nunavut: Nunavut
- Region: Qikiqtaaluk

Demographics
- Population: Uninhabited
- Source: MacColl Island at Atlas of Canada

MacColl Island is one of the many uninhabited Canadian arctic islands in Qikiqtaaluk Region, Nunavut. It is located at the confluence of Hudson Strait and the Labrador Sea.

The island measures 5 mi (8.0 km) long and is 152 m (499 ft) above sea level. It is a member of the Button Islands, situated west of and parallel to Lawson Island. Other islands in the immediate vicinity include Erhardt Island, Holdridge Island, King Island, Leading Island, and Observation Island.
