= Northwest Atlantic Mid-Ocean Channel =

Hudson Strait area undersea channels

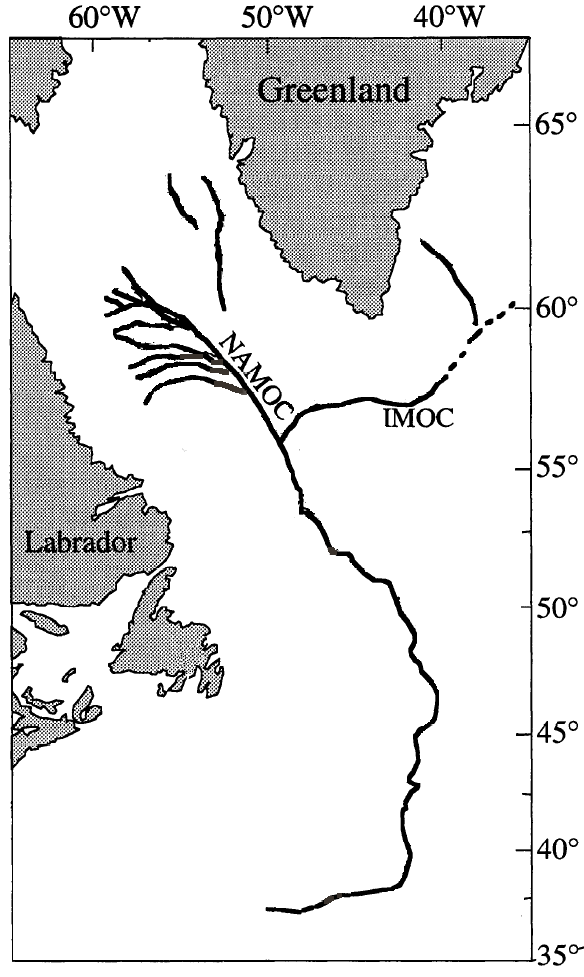
A map of the NAMOC with its major tributary IMOC.

The Northwest Atlantic Mid-Ocean Channel (NAMOC) is the main body of a turbidity current system of channels and canyons running on the sea bottom from the Hudson Strait, through the Labrador Sea, and ending at the Sohm Abyssal Plain in the Atlantic Ocean. Contrary to most other such systems which fan away from the main channel, numerous tributaries run into the NAMOC and end there. The density of those tributaries is the highest near the Labrador Peninsula, but the longest tributary, called Imarssuak Mid-Ocean Channel (IMOC), originates in the Atlantic Ocean.

Most topography data on the NAMOC originates from wide-range sonar scans. With a total length of about 3,800 km (2,361 mi), NAMOC is one of the longest underwater channels in the world. It is 100–200 m deep and 2–5 km wide at the channel floor. The rising levees of the NAMOC (about 100 m above the sea bed) often hinders confluence of some tributaries, which instead run along NAMOC for hundreds of km. Its western (right-hand, max. height 250 m) levee rises some 100 m above the eastern one (max. height 150 m). This asymmetry is attributed to the Coriolis effect affecting the turbidity currents, which reach velocities of 6–8.5 m/s and deposit silt and clay over the channel. The levee is absent in some parts of the NAMOC, for example between 56°N and 57°N, due to the local side-flows of sand.

The meandering of the NAMOC is relatively small compared to other underwater channels, such as Amazon Canyon. It is more developed in the northern part, with a period increasing from 25 km between 59°45'N and 56°N to 50 km between 56°N and 54°30'N. The channel becomes on average more straight towards the south, but it still contains abrupt turns due to local seamounts sea bed fractures.

== See also ==
- Abyssal fan
- Submarine canyon
