= Holdridge Island =

Island in Nunavut, Canada

- Location within Nunavut Location within Canada

Geography
- Location: Confluence of Hudson Strait and the Labrador Sea
- Coordinates: 60°35′26″N 64°44′12″W
- Archipelago: Arctic Archipelago
- Highest elevation: 91 m (299 ft)

Administration
- Canada
- Nunavut: Nunavut
- Region: Qikiqtaaluk

Demographics
- Population: Uninhabited
- Source: Holdridge Island at Atlas of Canada

Holdridge Island is one of the many uninhabited Canadian arctic islands in Qikiqtaaluk Region, Nunavut. It is located at the confluence of Hudson Strait and the Labrador Sea.

Holdridge Island's highest mount is 91 m (299 ft) above sea level.

It is a member of the Button Islands and is situated west of the southern end of Lawson Island. Other islands in the immediate vicinity include Dolphin Island, King Island, Leading Island, Niels Island, and Observation Island.
