= King Island (Nunavut) =

Island in Qikiqtaaluk Region, Nunavut, Canada

- Location within Nunavut Location within Canada

Geography
- Location: Confluence of Hudson Strait and the Labrador Sea
- Coordinates: 60.60°N 64.77°W
- Archipelago: Arctic Archipelago

Administration
- Canada
- Nunavut: Nunavut
- Region: Qikiqtaaluk

Demographics
- Population: Uninhabited

King Island is one of the many uninhabited Canadian arctic islands in Qikiqtaaluk Region, Nunavut. It is located at the confluence of Hudson Strait and the Labrador Sea.

King Island has a noticeable cliff on its southeastern side.

It is a member of the Button Islands and is situated southwest of MacColl Island. Other islands in the immediate vicinity include Clark Island, Holdridge Island, Leading Island, Niels Island, and Observation Island.
