= Observation Island (Nunavut) =

Island in Nunavut, Canada

- Location within Nunavut Location within Canada

Geography
- Location: Confluence of Hudson Strait and the Labrador Sea
- Coordinates: 60°37′N 64°43′W
- Archipelago: Arctic Archipelago

Administration
- Canada
- Nunavut: Nunavut
- Region: Qikiqtaaluk

Demographics
- Population: Uninhabited
- Source: Observation Island at Atlas of Canada

Observation Island is one of the many uninhabited Canadian arctic islands in Qikiqtaaluk Region, Nunavut. It is located at the confluence of Hudson Strait and the Labrador Sea.

Other islands in the immediate vicinity include Holdridge Island, Lawson Island, Leading Island, and MacColl Island.
