= Leading Island =

Canadian Arctic island

- Location within Nunavut Location within Canada

Geography
- Location: Confluence of Hudson Strait and the Labrador Sea
- Coordinates: 60°35′39″N 64°44′54″W
- Archipelago: Arctic Archipelago
- Highest elevation: 9 m (30 ft)

Administration
- Canada
- Nunavut: Nunavut
- Region: Qikiqtaaluk

Demographics
- Population: Uninhabited
- Source: Leading Island at Atlas of Canada

Leading Island is one of the many uninhabited Canadian arctic islands in Qikiqtaaluk Region, Nunavut. It is located at the confluence of Hudson Strait and the Labrador Sea.

The island, west of Holdridge Island, is a small islet with an elevation of only 9 m (30 ft) above sea level. It is a member of the Button Islands.

Other islands in the immediate vicinity include Dolphin Island, King Island, Niels Island, and Observation Island.
