= Labrador Sea =

Arm of the North Atlantic Ocean

- Labradorhavet
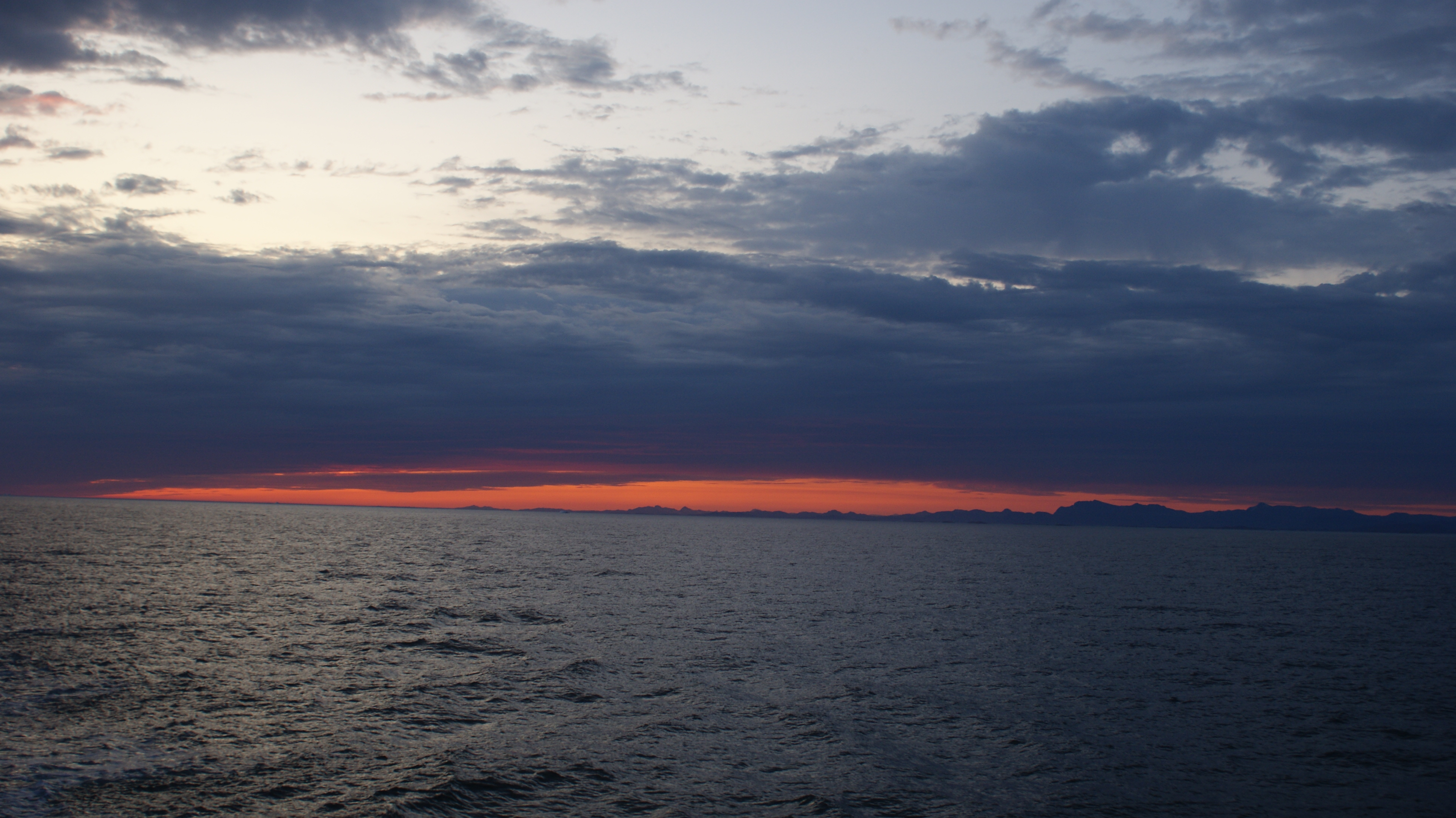
- Past sunset at Labrador Sea, off the coast of Paamiut (Frederikshåb), Greenland

- Location within Canada

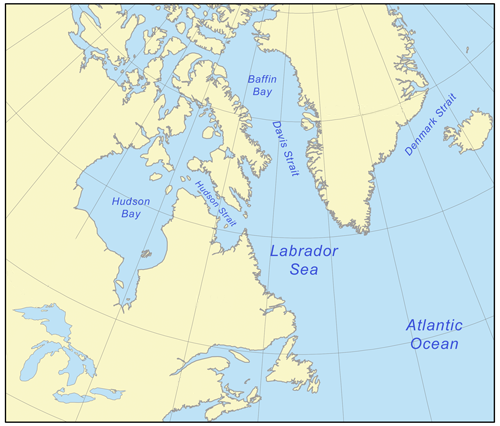
- Coordinates: 61°N 56°W
- Type: Sea
- Basin countries: Canada and Greenland
- Max. length: c. 1,000 km (621 mi)
- Max. width: c. 900 km (559 mi)
- Surface area: 841,000 km^{2} (324,700 sq mi)
- Average depth: 1,898 m (6,227 ft)
- Max. depth: 4,316 m (14,160 ft)

The Labrador Sea (French: mer du Labrador; Danish: Labradorhavet) is an arm of the North Atlantic Ocean between the Labrador Peninsula and Greenland. The sea is flanked by continental shelves to the southwest, northwest, and northeast. It connects to the north with Baffin Bay through the Davis Strait. It is a marginal sea of the Atlantic.

The sea formed upon separation of the North American Plate and Greenland Plate that started about 60 million years ago and stopped about 40 million years ago. It contains one of the world's largest turbidity current channel systems, the Northwest Atlantic Mid-Ocean Channel (NAMOC), that runs for thousands of kilometres along the sea bottom toward the Atlantic Ocean.

The Labrador Sea is a major source of the North Atlantic Deep Water, a cold water mass that flows at great depth along the western edge of the North Atlantic.

Map showing the Labrador Sea according to the IHO definition

== History ==
The Labrador Sea formed upon separation of the North American Plate and Greenland Plate that started about 60 million years ago (Paleocene) and stopped about 40 million years ago. A sedimentary basin, which is now buried under the continental shelves, formed during the Cretaceous. Onset of magmatic sea-floor spreading was accompanied by volcanic eruptions of picrites and basalts in the Paleocene at the Davis Strait and Baffin Bay.

Between about 500 BC and 1300 AD, the southern coast of the sea contained Dorset, Beothuk, and Inuit settlements; Dorset tribes were later replaced by Thule people.

== Extent ==
The International Hydrographic Organization defines the limits of the Labrador Sea as follows:

On the North: the South limit of Davis Strait [The parallel of 60° North between Greenland and Labrador].

On the East: a line from Cape St. Francis 47°45′N 52°27′W (Newfoundland) to Cape Farewell (Greenland).

On the West: the East Coast of Labrador and Newfoundland and the Northeast limit of the Gulf of St. Lawrence – a line running from Cape Bauld (North point of Kirpon Island, 51°40′N 55°25′W) to the East extreme of Belle Isle and on to the Northeast Ledge (52°02′N 55°15′W). Thence a line joining this ledge with the East extreme of Cape St. Charles (52°13'N) in Labrador.

Natural Resources Canada uses a slightly different definition, putting the northern boundary of the Labrador Sea on a straight line from a headland on Killiniq Island abutting Lady Job Harbour to Cape Farewell.

== Oceanography ==
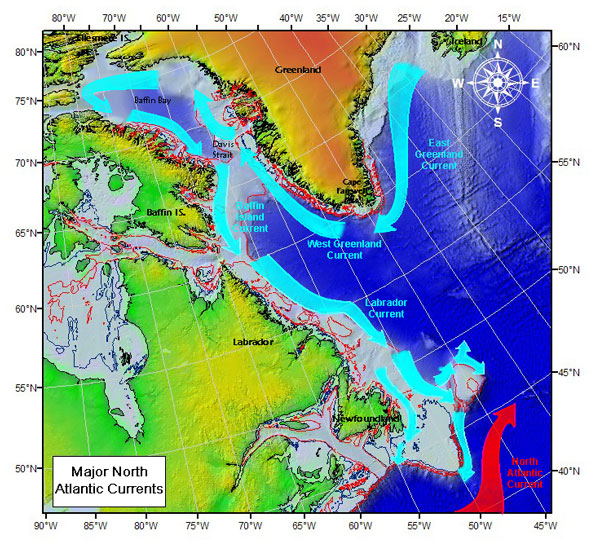
Major North Atlantic currents

The Labrador Sea is about 3,400 m (1,859 fathoms; 11,155 feet) deep and 1,000 km (621 miles; 540 nautical miles) wide where it joins the Atlantic Ocean. It becomes shallower, to less than 700 m (383 fathoms; 2,297 ft) towards Baffin Bay (see depth map) and passes into the 300 km (190 mi; 160 nmi) wide Davis Strait. A 100–200 m (55–109 fathoms; 330–660 ft) deep turbidity current channel system, which is about 2–5 km (1.2–3.1 mi; 1.1–2.7 nmi) wide and 3,800 km (2,400 mi; 2,100 nmi) long, runs on the bottom of the sea, near its center from the Hudson Strait into the Atlantic. It is called the Northwest Atlantic Mid-Ocean Channel (NAMOC) and is one of the world's longest drainage systems of Pleistocene age. It appears as a submarine river bed with numerous tributaries and is maintained by high-density turbidity currents flowing within the levees.

The water temperature varies between −1 °C (30 °F) in winter and 5–6 °C (41–43 °F) in summer. The salinity is relatively low, at 31–34.9 parts per thousand. Two-thirds of the sea is covered in ice in winter. Tides are semi-diurnal (i.e. occur twice a day), reaching 4 m (2.2 fathoms; 13 ft).

There is an anticlockwise water circulation in the sea. It is initiated by the East Greenland Current and continued by the West Greenland Current, which brings warmer, more saline waters northwards, along the Greenland coasts up to the Baffin Bay. Then, the Baffin Island Current and Labrador Current transport cold and less saline water southward along the Canadian coast. These currents carry numerous icebergs and therefore hinder navigation and exploration of the gas fields beneath the sea bed. The speed of the Labrador current is typically 0.3–0.5 m/s (0.98–1.64 ft/s), but can reach 1 m/s (3.3 ft/s) in some areas, whereas the Baffin Current is somewhat slower at about 0.2 m/s (0.66 ft/s). The Labrador Current maintains the water temperature at 0 °C (32 °F) and salinity between 30 and 34 parts per thousand.

The sea provides a significant part of the North Atlantic Deep Water (NADW) — a cold water mass that flows at great depth along the western edge of the North Atlantic, spreading out to form the largest identifiable water mass in the World Ocean. The NADW consists of three parts of different origin and salinity, and the top one, the Labrador Sea Water (LSW), is formed in the Labrador Sea. This part occurs at a medium depth and has a relatively low salinity (34.84–34.89 parts per thousand), low temperature (3.3–3.4 °C (37.9–38.1 °F)) and high oxygen content compared to the layers above and below it. LSW also has a relatively low vorticity, i.e. the tendency to form vortices, than any other water in North Atlantic that reflects its high homogeneity. It has a potential density of 27.76–27.78 mg/cm^{3} relatively to the surface layers, meaning it is denser, and thus sinks under the surface and remains homogeneous and unaffected by the surface fluctuations.

== Fauna ==
The northern and western parts of the Labrador Sea are covered in ice between December and June. This drift ice serves as a breeding ground for several types of pinnipeds (including Atlantic walrus and bearded, grey, harbor, harp, hooded and ringed seals). Several cetacean species feed in these abundant waters in early spring, including blue, fin, humpback, long-finned pilot, minke, the critically endangered North Atlantic right, sei and sperm whales. The sea contains one of the two primary populations of sei whales, the other being the Scotian Shelf. Pods of beluga (white) whales are more common further to the north, west and south (notably in Baffin Bay, where their population reaches around 20,000 animals), and further afield in Hudson Bay and the Gulf of Saint Lawrence. While somewhat rarer in the Labrador Sea—especially since the 1950s— some sightings still take place. Additionally, pods of orca are drawn to the sea by the large shoals of fish, as well as the many marine mammal species they may hunt (including other cetaceans and pinnipeds), such as harbour porpoise and Atlantic white-sided, common, striped and white-beaked dolphins.

The sea is also a feeding-ground for Atlantic salmon. Shrimp fisheries began in 1978, intensifying by 2000, in addition to cod fishing. However, by the 1990s, the cod fishing had already depleted the fishes' population near the Labrador and West Greenland banks, and was therefore halted in 1992. Other fishery targets include haddock, Atlantic herring, lobster, several species of flatfish, and pelagic fish, such as sand lance and capelin. They are most abundant in the southern parts of the sea.

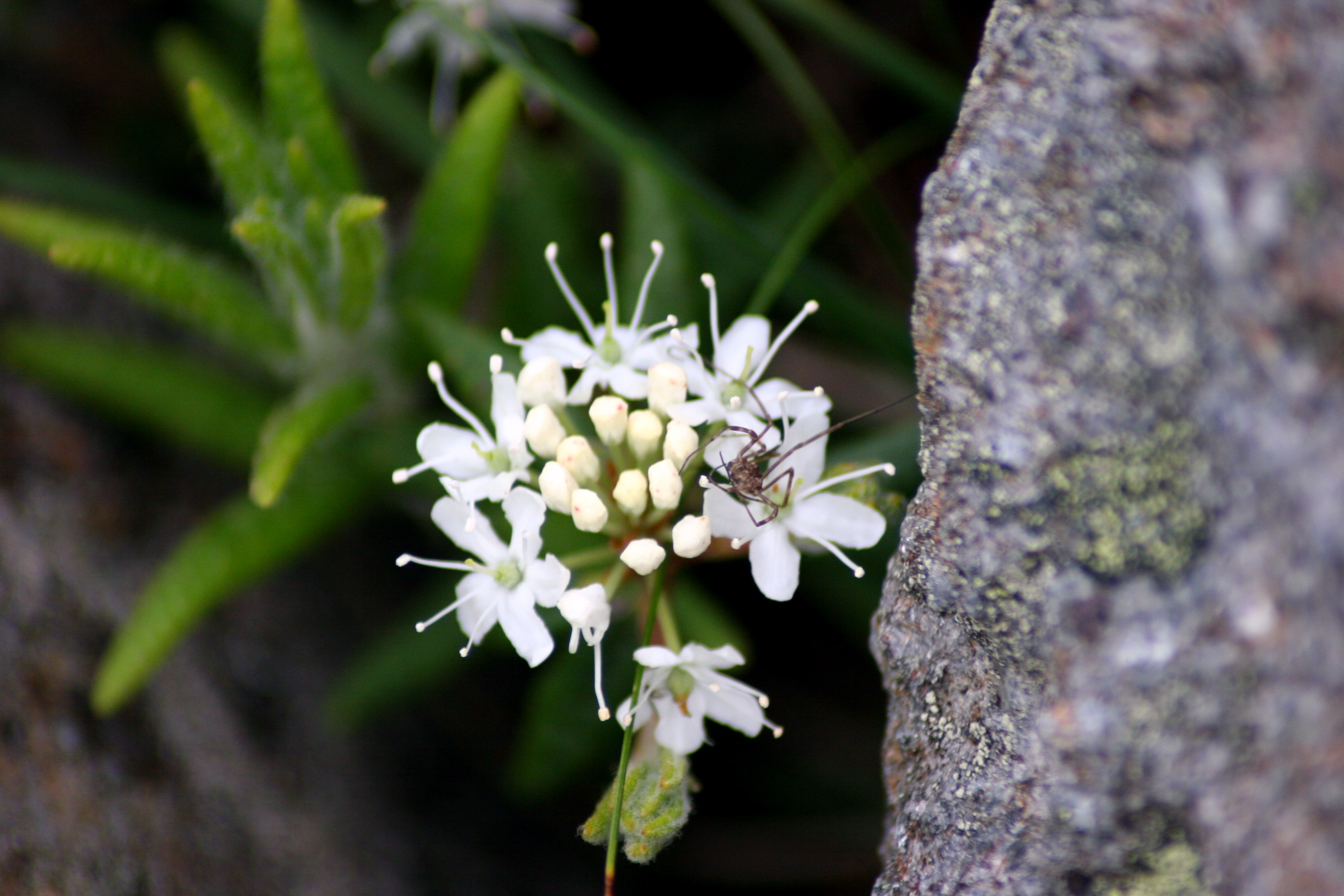
Close up of a Labrador tea flower

The Labrador duck was a common bird on the Canadian coast until the 19th century, but is now extinct. Other coastal animals include the Labrador wolf (Canis lupus labradorius), woodland caribou (Rangifer tarandus caribou), moose (Alces alces), black bear (Ursus americanus), Canada lynx (Lynx canadensis), red fox (Vulpes vulpes), Arctic fox (Alopex lagopus), wolverine (G. gulo), American mink (Neogale vison), North American river otter (Lontra canadensis), snowshoe hare (Lepus americanus), grouse (Dendragapus spp.), osprey (Pandion haliaetus), raven (Corvus corax), ducks, geese, swans, partridge and pheasant. Occasionally, coastal polar bear (Ursus maritimus) sightings occur along the sea, mainly further north but sometimes as far south as Conception Bay and the mouth of the Gulf of Saint Lawrence.

== Flora ==
Coastal vegetation includes black spruce (Picea mariana), tamarack, white spruce (P. glauca), dwarf birch (Betula spp.), aspen, willow (Salix spp.), ericaceous shrubs (Ericaceae), cottongrass (Eriophorum spp.), sedge (Carex spp.), lichens and moss. Evergreen bushes of Labrador tea, which is used to make herbal teas, are common in the area, both on the Greenland and Canadian coasts.
