= 1926 Nova Scotia hurricane =

Category 3 Atlantic hurricane in 1926

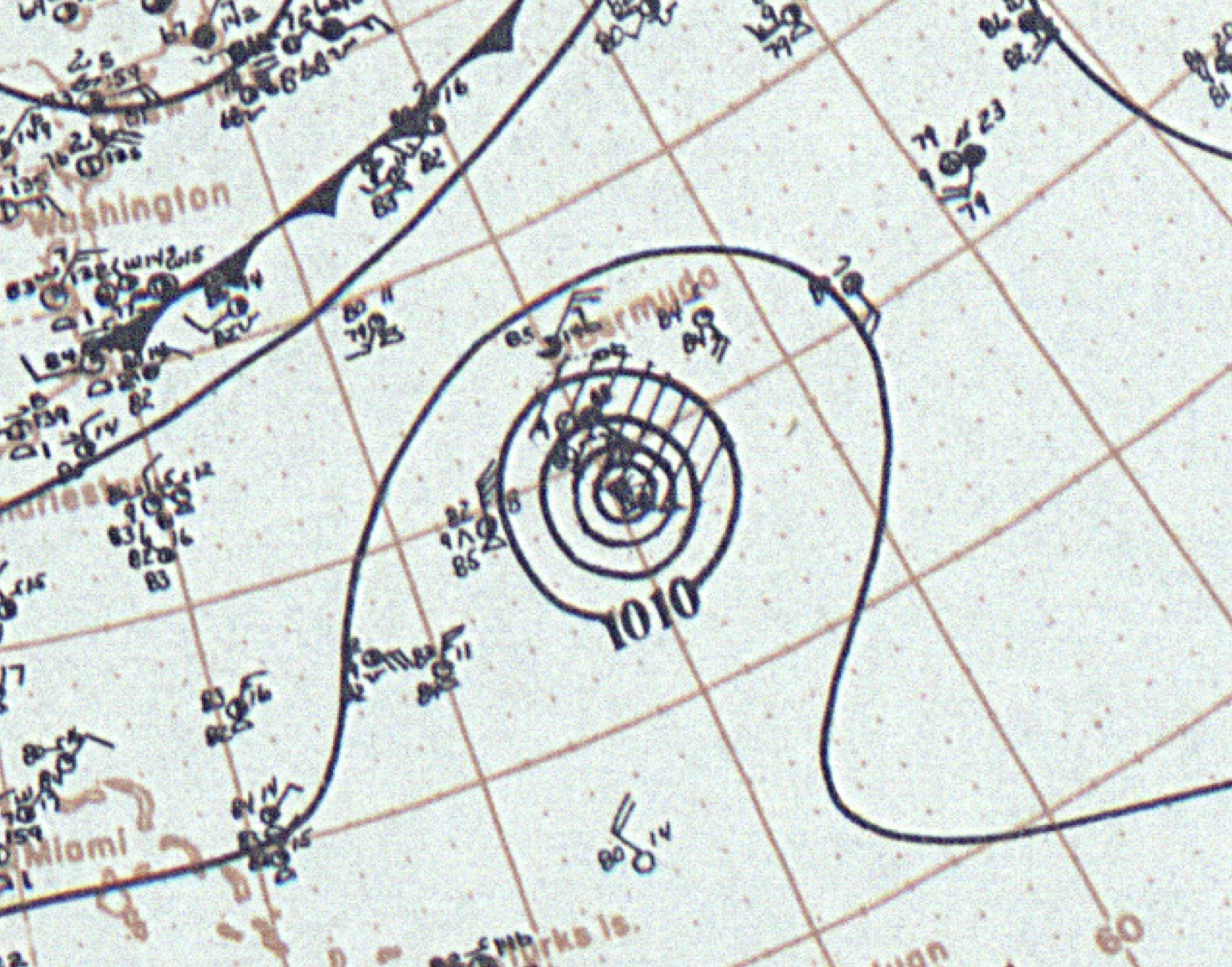
- Surface weather analysis of the hurricane approaching Bermuda on August 5

Meteorological history
- Formed: July 29, 1926
- Dissipated: August 8, 1926

Category 3 major hurricane
- 1-minute sustained (SSHWS/NWS)
- Highest winds: 120 mph (195 km/h)
- Lowest pressure: 968 mbar (hPa); 28.59 inHg

Overall effects
- Fatalities: 55–58+
- Areas affected: Bermuda, Atlantic Canada
- IBTrACS
- Part of the 1926 Atlantic hurricane season

The 1926 Nova Scotia hurricane (also known as the 1926 Great August Gale) was one of the deadliest Canadian hurricanes in the 20th century. The second tropical cyclone and second hurricane of the season, the storm developed from a trough situated well east of the Leeward Islands on July 29. Over the next few days, it moved west-northwest, becoming a tropical storm by July 31. The cyclone turned to the northwest on August 1 and began strengthening rapidly, reaching hurricane intensity by the early afternoon. The next day, it became a major hurricane—equivalent to Category 3 intensity on the modern-day Saffir–Simpson hurricane wind scale. Over the next few days, the storm's track varied between north-northwest and northwest. Early on August 5, it peaked with winds of 120 mph (190 km/h). The hurricane then began weakening as it curved northward. The storm began losing tropical characteristics while approaching Atlantic Canada, transitioning into an extratropical cyclone on August 8. The remnants soon made landfall near Port Hawkesbury, Nova Scotia, with winds of 75 mph (121 km/h), before being last noted over Newfoundland later that day.

The hurricane produced sustained winds of 54 mph (87 km/h) on Bermuda while passing about 80 mi (130 km) west of the island, but left minimal impact. In Atlantic Canada, the cyclone sank several ships and boats offshore Nova Scotia, including the schooners Sylvia Mosher and Sadie Knickle. A total of 55–58 deaths occurred, including at least 49 from those two ships crashing ashore Sable Island. On land, the storm downed trees and electrical poles in Nova Scotia, damaging some homes and leaving telephone service outages. Crops and fruit trees were also damaged. High winds interrupted telegraph communications in Newfoundland. Despite the number of fatalities, little was done to mitigate for a tropical cyclone prior to the hurricane in August 1927, which caused more than three times as many deaths.

== Meteorological history ==
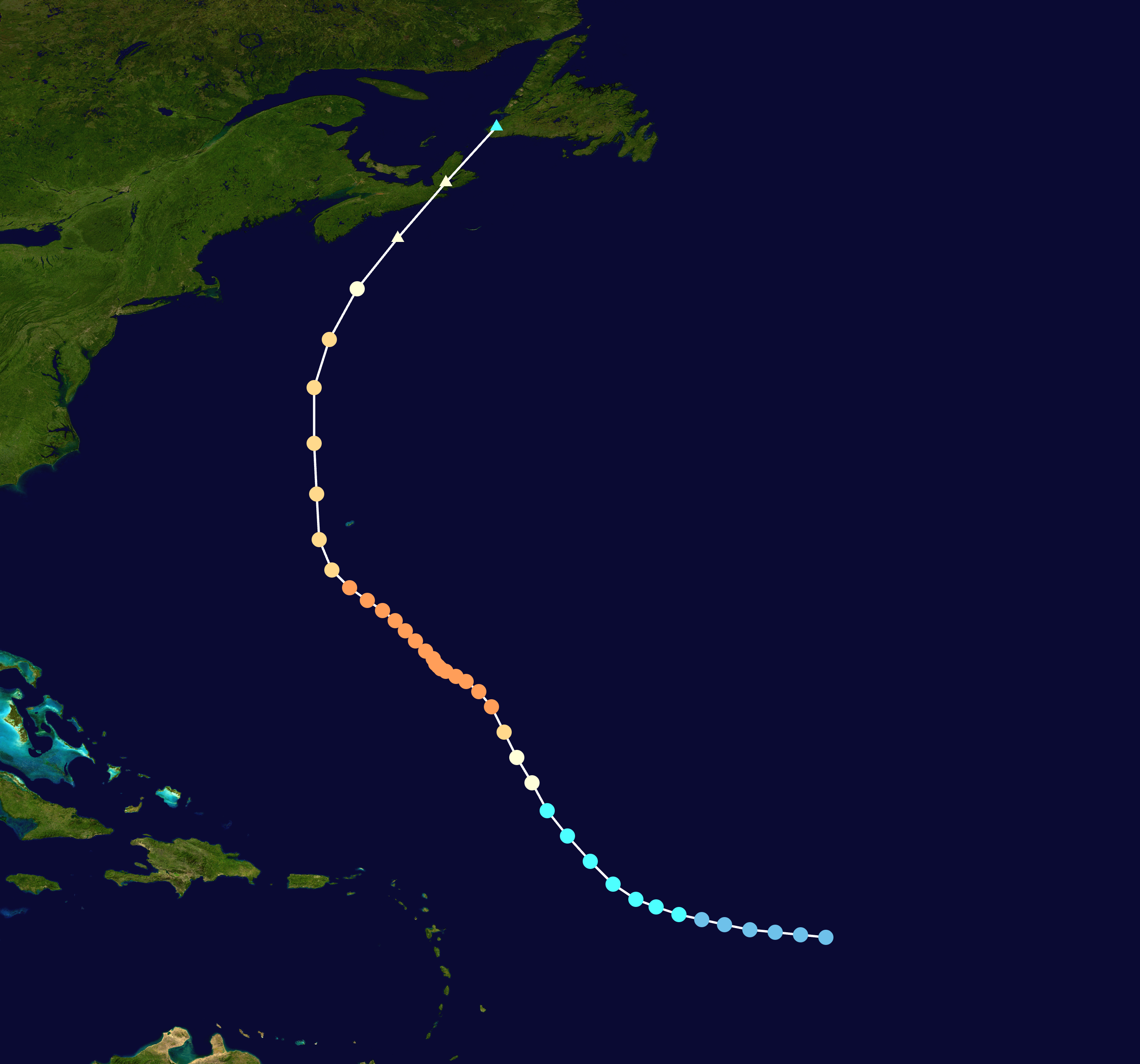
Map plotting the storm's track and intensity, according to the Saffir–Simpson scale Map key Saffir–Simpson scale Tropical depression (≤38 mph, ≤62 km/h) Tropical storm (39–73 mph, 63–118 km/h) Category 1 (74–95 mph, 119–153 km/h) Category 2 (96–110 mph, 154–177 km/h) Category 3 (111–129 mph, 178–208 km/h) Category 4 (130–156 mph, 209–251 km/h) Category 5 (≥157 mph, ≥252 km/h) Unknown Storm type Tropical cyclone Subtropical cyclone Extratropical cyclone, remnant low, tropical disturbance, or monsoon depression

According to the Atlantic hurricane database, a trough situated more than 1,200 mi (1,930 km) east of the Leeward Islands developed into a tropical depression around 12:00 UTC on July 29. The cyclone initially moved west-northwestward and strengthened, becoming a tropical storm by 00:00 UTC on July 31. On August 1, the cyclone turned northwestward and began strengthening rapidly. Based on ship reports of hurricane force and near-hurricane-force winds, it estimated the storm intensified into a Category 1 hurricane by 18:00 UTC. Early on August 2, the system intensified into a Category 2 hurricane. At 12:00 UTC, the cyclone became a major hurricane—with winds of at least 115 mph (185 km/h)—equivalent to Category 3 intensity on the modern-day Saffir–Simpson scale. Around that time, a ship recorded a barometric pressure of 968 mbar (28.6 inHg) – the lowest known pressure in association with the storm. However, no ships entered the eye of the hurricane and sampled the lowest pressure in the storm.

Over the next few days, the track of the hurricane varied between north-northwest and northwest. After becoming a Category 3 hurricane on August 2, the hurricane may have maintained sustained winds of 115 mph (185 km/h) for about three days, before wind increased slightly further to 120 mph (190 km/h), an estimate made based on the pressure–wind relationship. It curved to the north and weakened to a Category 2 before passing about 80 mi (129 km) west of Bermuda on August 6. Around 00:00 UTC on August 8, the storm weakened into a Category 1 hurricane and transitioned into an extratropical cyclone about six hours later. Shortly before 12:00 UTC, the extratropical remnants of the hurricane made landfall near Port Hawkesbury, Nova Scotia, with winds of 75 mph (121 km/h), and continued northeastward until being last noted over southwestern Newfoundland around 18:00 UTC.

== Preparations ==
Due to the possibility of gale-force winds occurring just offshore Maine, storm warnings were issued between Portland and Eastport. Shipping ahead of the hurricane received repeated warnings broadcast by both American and Canadian weather officials. However, the majority of fishing vessels in Atlantic Canada in this period did not have radios, leaving the large fishing fleet on the offshore banks unaware of the approaching disaster.

== Impact ==
Deadliest Canada hurricanes
| Rank | Hurricane | Season | Fatalities |
|---|---|---|---|
| 1 | "Newfoundland (1)" | 1775 | 4,000–4,163† |
| 2 | "Nova Scotia (1)" | 1873 | 600† |
| 3 | "Nova Scotia (3)" | 1927 | 173–192† |
| 4 | "Labrador" | 1882 | 140 |
| 5 | Hazel | 1954 | 81 |
| 6 | "Newfoundland (2)" | 1883 | 80 |
| 7 | "Nova Scotia (2)" | 1926 | 55–58† |
| 8 | "Galveston" | 1900 | 52–232† |
| 9 | "Newfoundland (3)" | 1935 | 50† |
| 10 | "Saxby Gale" | 1869 | 37+ |
† – Estimated total
Source: NOAA

Vessels lost during the 1926 hurricane
| Ship name | Crew lost |
|---|---|
| Edith Newhall | 1 |
| Ringhorn | 5 |
| Sadie A. Knickle | 24–26 |
| Sylvia Mosher | 25–26 |
| Total | 55–58 |

The system produced winds of 54 mph (87 km/h) on Bermuda as it passed very close to that island. About this time, five ocean liners near each other encountered the storm; some portholes on the Orca were damaged and 15 passengers were treated for cuts, bruises, and contusions. Off Nova Scotia, the cyclone produced an unspecified number of casualties, including the sinking of the schooners Sylvia Mosher and Sadie Knickle. Five people died and one other person was injured after the Norwegian steamer Ringhord capsized near Scatarie Island. One person also drowned after the Edith Newhall sank. Many other boats and ships in and near Nova Scotia capsized or ran aground, including 11 ships at New Harbour, 2 motorboats at Mosher's Head, another motorboat at Spectacle Island, and several at the Chester harbor. Additionally, at least nine small boats, four schooners, a skiff, and several other vessels were wrecked in Newfoundland and Labrador. Overall, between 55 and 58 deaths occurred at sea, including 49 from the Sylvia Mosher and the Sadie Knickle crashing ashore Sable Island.

On land, the storm extensively damaged fruit trees and crops in some areas of Nova Scotia, especially in Truro. Several homes were left without telephone service in Chester after lightning struck several poles. A few homes were damaged by lightning in the town, while a home and a shed were destroyed by lightning in Kemptville. High winds in Newfoundland also interrupted telegraph communications. In New Brunswick, 3.9 in (99 mm) of rainfall was observed Fredericton, the highest precipitation total recorded from the hurricane.

With at least 55 fatalities, the hurricane was the deadliest in Canada since a hurricane in 1900. The system also ranks as the third deadliest Canadian tropical cyclone of the 20th century, behind only a hurricane in 1927 and the remnants of Hurricane Hazel in 1954. After the storm, Lunenburg Progress Enterprise publisher William Duff was one of few people calling for schooners to be supplied with transmission and receiving radio equipment, while there were a few requests for a rescue ship to be stationed at the fishing banks on standby should other ships become distressed. However, little was done to improve mitigation prior to the hurricane in August 1927. In Nova Scotia, the families of the victims of the storm received monetary compensation via the Workplace Safety & Insurance Board. The agency became severely depleted of funds, leading the board to announce a 5% increase in insurance rates for the fishing industry. Captains and vessel owners responded by threatening to go on strike, forcing the board to reverse their decision.

== See also ==
- List of Canada hurricanes
- 1927 Nova Scotia hurricane
- Hurricane Bill (2009)
- Hurricane Earl (2010)
