= Hurricane Hazel =

Category 4 Atlantic hurricane in 1954

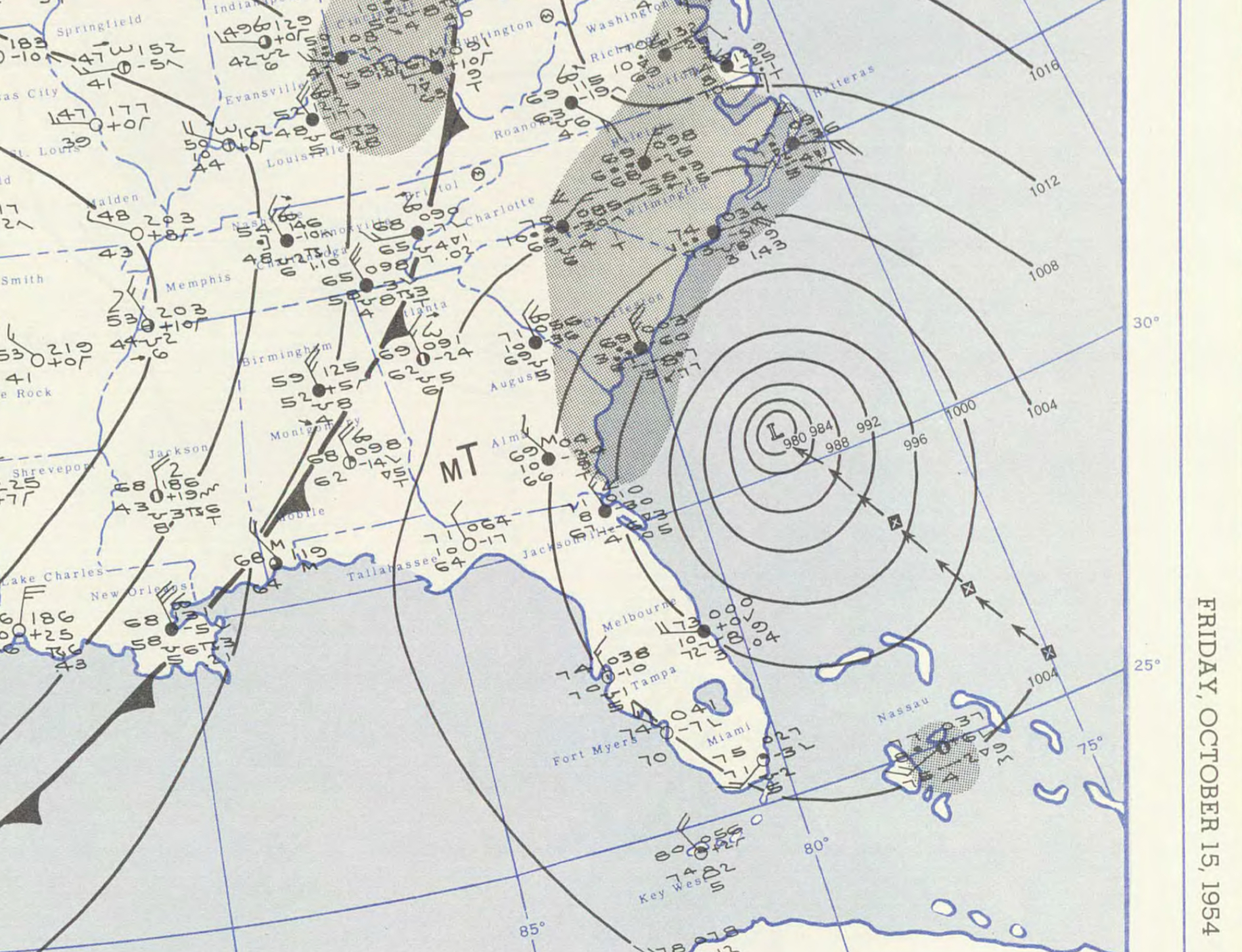
- Surface weather analysis of Hurricane Hazel near peak intensity and landfall in North Carolina on October 15

Meteorological history
- Formed: October 5, 1954
- Extratropical: October 15, 1954
- Dissipated: October 18, 1954

Category 4 major hurricane
- 1-minute sustained (SSHWS/NWS)
- Highest winds: 130 mph (215 km/h)
- Lowest pressure: 938 mbar (hPa); 27.70 inHg

Overall effects
- Fatalities: 592–1,192
- Damage: $382 million (1954 USD)
- Areas affected: Caribbean, East Coast of the United States, Ontario
- IBTrACS
- Part of the 1954 Atlantic hurricane season

Hurricane Hazel was the deadliest, second-costliest, and most intense hurricane of the 1954 Atlantic hurricane season. The storm killed at least 469 people in Haiti before it struck the United States near the border between North and South Carolina as a Category 4 hurricane. After causing 95 fatalities in the US, Hazel struck Canada as an extratropical storm, which raised the death toll by 81 people, mostly in Toronto. As a result of the high death toll and the damage caused by Hazel, its name was retired from use for North Atlantic hurricanes.

In Haiti, Hazel destroyed 40 percent of the coffee trees and 50 percent of the cacao crop, which affected the economy for several years. The hurricane made landfall near Calabash, North Carolina, and destroyed most waterfront dwellings. It then traveled north along the Atlantic coast. Hazel affected Virginia; Washington, D.C.; West Virginia; Maryland; Delaware; New Jersey; Pennsylvania; and New York. It brought gusts near 100 mph (160 km/h) and caused $281 million (1954 USD) in damage. When it was over Pennsylvania, Hazel consolidated with a cold front and turned northwest towards Canada. When it hit Ontario as an extratropical storm, rivers and streams in and around Toronto overflowed their banks, which caused severe flooding. As a result, many residential areas in the local floodplains, such as the Raymore Drive area, were subsequently converted to parkland. In Canada alone, over C$135 million (2025: C$1.6 billion) of damage was incurred.

The effects of Hazel were particularly unprecedented in Toronto because of a combination of heavy rainfall during the preceding weeks, a lack of experience in dealing with hurricanes, and the storm's unexpected retention of power despite traveling 1,100 km (680 mi) over land. The storm stalled over the Toronto area, and although it was now extratropical, it remained as powerful as a Category 1 hurricane. To help with the cleanup, 800 members of the military were summoned, and a Hurricane Relief Fund was established that distributed $5.1 million (2025: $61.1 million) in aid.

== Meteorological history ==
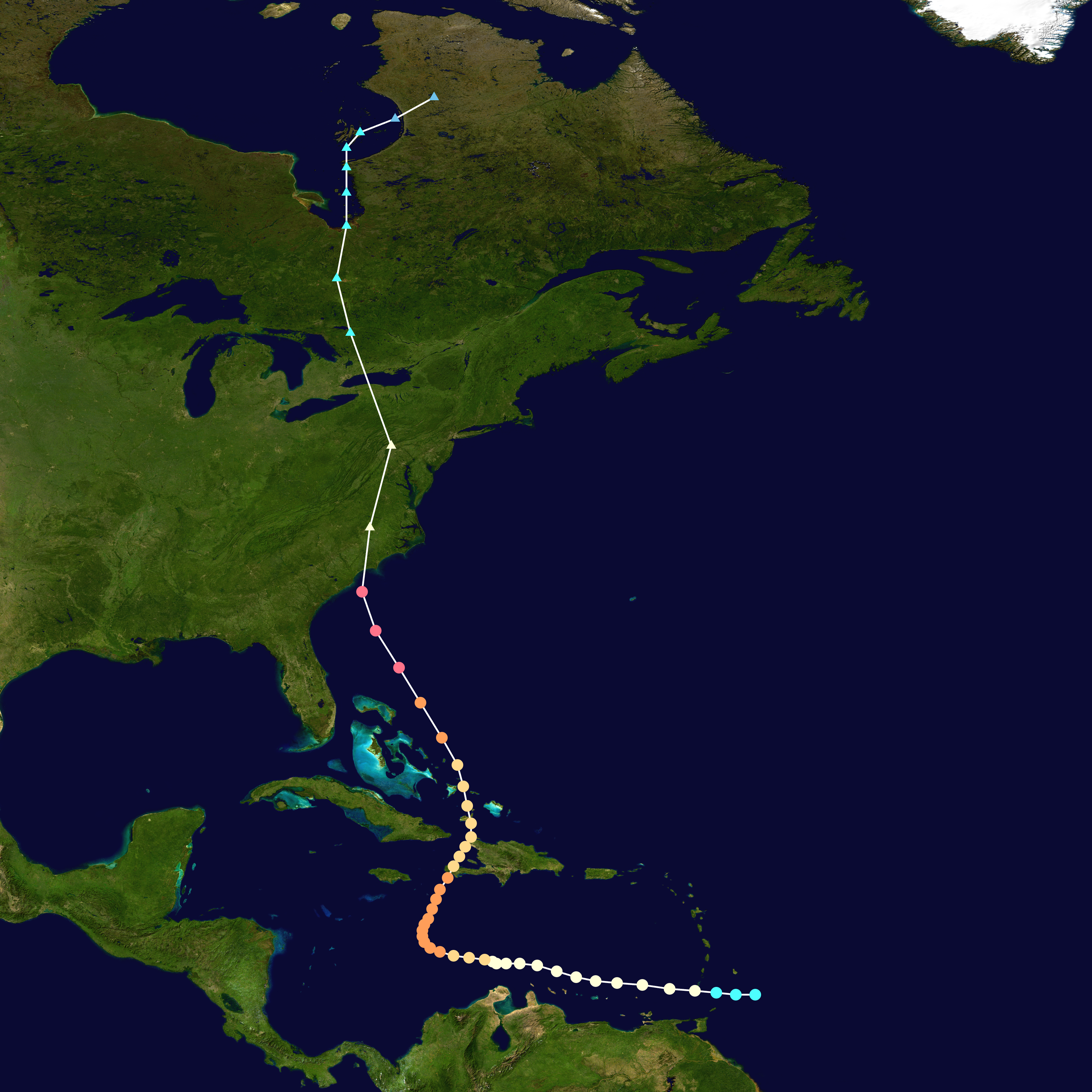
Map plotting the storm's track and intensity, according to the Saffir–Simpson scale Map key Saffir–Simpson scale Tropical depression (≤38 mph, ≤62 km/h) Tropical storm (39–73 mph, 63–118 km/h) Category 1 (74–95 mph, 119–153 km/h) Category 2 (96–110 mph, 154–177 km/h) Category 3 (111–129 mph, 178–208 km/h) Category 4 (130–156 mph, 209–251 km/h) Category 5 (≥157 mph, ≥252 km/h) Unknown Storm type Tropical cyclone Subtropical cyclone Extratropical cyclone, remnant low, tropical disturbance, or monsoon depression

On October 5, a tropical wave with tropical-storm force winds was approaching the Lesser Antilles. Due to the potential for tropical storm formation, a Hurricane Hunters plane flew from San Juan, Puerto Rico, to investigate the system. When the plane reached the system, they observed a tropical cyclone about 30 mi (48 km) east of the island of Grenada with winds estimated at 100 mph (160 km/h). The United States Weather Bureau promptly classified the system as Hurricane Hazel. The Atlantic hurricane reanalysis later assessed that Hazel developed at 06:00 UTC on October 5 about 220 mi (350 km) east of Grenada. Although the Hurricane Hunters observed hurricane-force winds, the storm had a small eye 5 mi (8 km) in diameter and a central barometric pressure of 1,002 mbar (29.6 inHg). The 100 mph (160 km/h) winds were therefore revised downward to 65 mph (105 km/h) late on October 5, though it was estimated that the storm attained hurricane status at 00:00 UTC on October 6. At the same time, Hazel made landfall on Grenada with winds of 75 mph (121 km/h).

After entering the Caribbean Sea, Hazel continued to present a small eye and wind diameter. The winds gradually increased as the storm moved westward, parallel to the northern coast of Venezuela. On October 8, the tiny eye increased to a diameter of 29 mi (47 km), while the winds reached 85 mph (137 km/h), although winds were estimated as high as 125 mph (201 km/h). That day, the Hurricane Hunters encountered severe turbulence, which hospitalized one crew member and injured another. For the next five days, there were no further flights into the core of the hurricane; However, the planes continued to monitor the storm, with radar imagery indicating that the eye became open and ragged. Late on October 9, it is estimated Hazel intensified into a major hurricane with winds of 115 mph (185 km/h). Originally, it was estimated that Hazel attained these winds the day prior. The intensification was confirmed on October 10, when aircraft noted a well-defined eye on radar imagery.

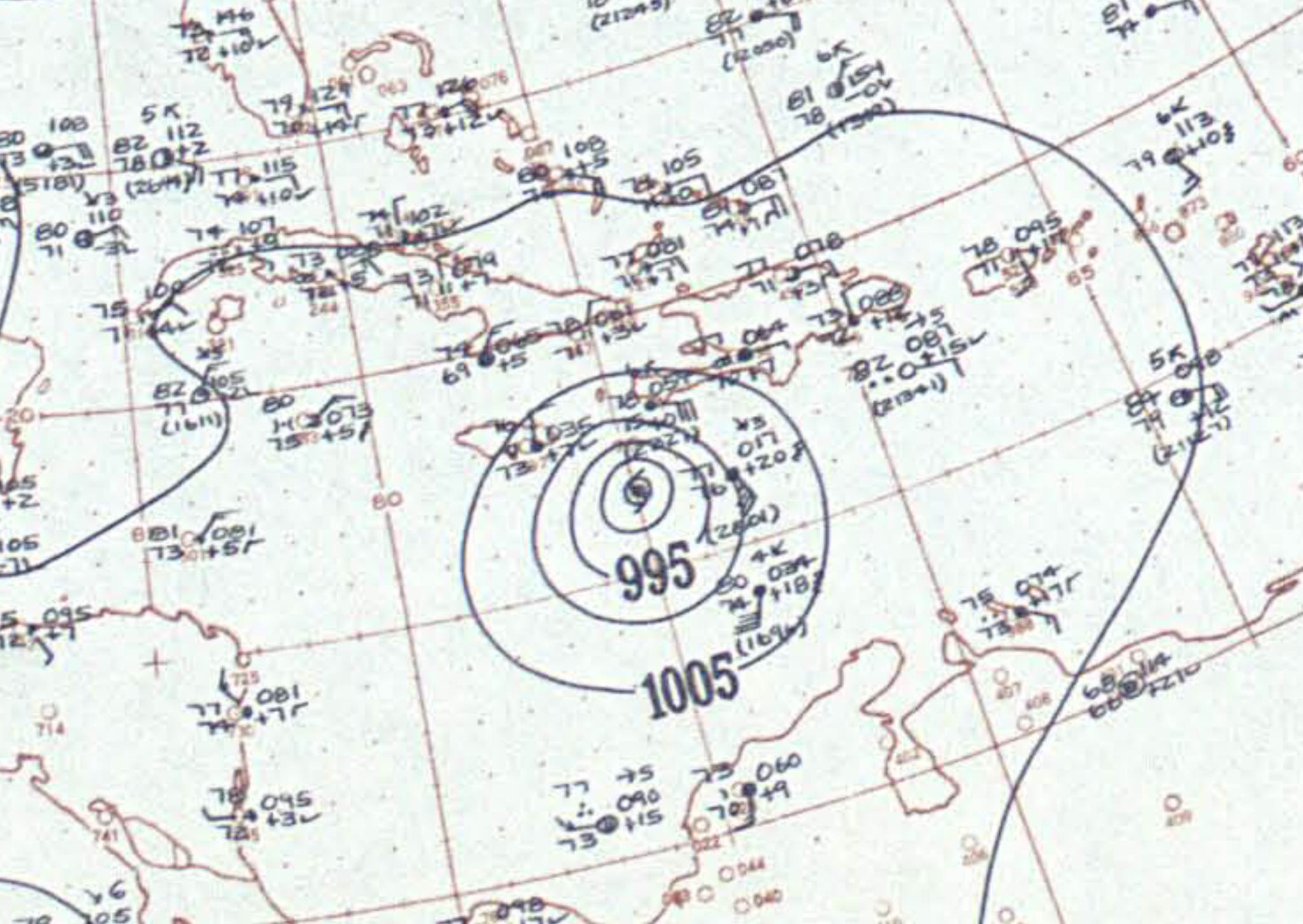
Surface weather map showing Hurricane Hazel approaching Haiti on October 11

On October 10, Hazel slowed in the central Caribbean and turned sharply to the north-northeast toward Hispaniola, steered by an upper-level low. At 09:00 UTC on October 12, the hurricane made landfall near Chardonnières along the Tiburon Peninsula of Haiti as a Category 3 hurricane on the Saffir-Simpson hurricane wind scale. There were no strong wind readings at landfall, but based on previous radar and aircraft observations the sustained winds were officially estimated at 120 mph (190 km/h). After moving through the Gulf of Gonâve, Hazel struck northwestern Haiti near Baie-de-Henne at 00:00 UTC on October 13, as a Category 2 hurricane with winds estimated at 100 mph (160 km/h). Around that time, the hurricane curved more to the north and northwest due to an approaching trough, and the Hurricane Hunters resumed entering the center of Hazel, reporting an eye and hurricane force winds. At 14:00 UTC on October 13, Hazel struck Inagua in the Bahamas with winds of 100 mph (160 km/h).

After affecting the Bahamas, Hazel accelerated northwest toward the southeastern United States, steered between a trough and a ridge. Hurricanes are generally expected to lose power after going north of Florida due to lower water temperatures. However, Hazel restrengthened as it tracked northward over the Gulf Stream. The Hurricane Hunters were unable to observe the core of the storm until it neared land, reporting an eye 18 mi (29 km) in diameter on October 15. Later that day, a ship just off South Carolina reported a central pressure of 938 mbar (27.7 inHg), which was the lowest in association with the hurricane. At 15:30 UTC on October 15, Hazel made landfall just west of the North Carolina/South Carolina border with a 40 mi (64 km) eye, slightly northeast of Myrtle Beach in the latter state. Based on the pressure, a larger than average size, and the fast forward movement, the landfall intensity was estimated at 130 mph (210 km/h), or a Category 4 on the Saffir-Simpson scale.

The eye of Hazel was tracked across several towns in North Carolina as the system continued northward. At 18:00 UTC on October 15, the hurricane became extratropical near Raleigh, and within six hours had passed near Washington, D.C. Its extratropical remnants accelerated to the north through Pennsylvania and New York along an extended cold front. Despite widespread observations across the eastern United States, there continues to be uncertainty in the track of Hazel as an extratropical storm. The Canadian weather service maintains that the original circulation dissipated over western Pennsylvania and a new one formed over western New York. In contrast, the U.S. Hurricane Research Division later assessed the circulation as becoming elongated but continuous. On October 16, the storm crossed into Ontario and over the Toronto region. Shortly thereafter, the former Hurricane Hazel dropped to gale-force winds after moving almost 1,000 km (620 mi) over land. The storm slowed and turned northward, passing over James Bay early on October 17. After turning to the northeast, into what is today known as the Kativik region of extreme northern Quebec, the remnants of Hazel were absorbed by a larger extratropical storm over Canada on October 18.

== Preparations ==
On October 6, small craft warnings were issued for the Dutch islands of Aruba, Bonaire, and Curaçao, despite predictions that Hazel would pass to the north; these warnings were canceled a day later. After the storm turned northward, tropical cyclone warnings were posted for Haiti, the Dominican Republic, and the waters of the Mona Passage. Small craft near Jamaica were advised to head for port ahead of the storm. The U.S. Navy completed extensive preparations at its Guantanamo Bay base, ordering about 1,000 civilians into hardened, fortified Quonset huts, flying aircraft out of the storm's path, and positioning surface ships out at sea.

On October 14, the United States Weather Bureau issued a warning for the Carolinas, with the caveat that the worst of the hurricane was expected to stay offshore. Instead, the storm took a sharp northwest turn and headed toward land. By evening of the same day, the storm was forecast to make landfall near the Carolinas border. Further forecasts expected Hazel to lose its power and dissipate over the Allegheny Mountains.

In her book Hurricane Hazel, Canadian journalist Betty Kennedy argued that in Canada, the impressions that Hazel was "the best-kept secret in town" and that it was a "fully documented meteorological event that should have taken nobody by surprise" both "paradoxically [...] contain a great deal of truth". Meteorologists predicted that if Hazel merged with the cold front, the storm would not lose intensity, but would instead potentially strengthen. Two Special Weather Bulletins were issued by the Dominion Weather Office, but since it was expected that the storm would pass east of Toronto, few other warnings were given and there were no evacuations, which increased the eventual property damage and loss of life. The forecast called for high winds between 65 and 80 km/h (40 and 50 mph), with only occasional showers. On lakes Erie and Ontario, ships received warnings of strong winds, and the predicted wind speeds ranged from 65 to 120 km/h (40 to 75 mph). Toronto Hydro called in standby crews as heavy winds were forecast, although they were almost sent home at one point due to a lull in the storm.

There was significant rainfall in the Toronto area in the two weeks prior to Hazel, so the ground was already saturated. Few people in Canada had any experience with hurricanes, since it was unheard of for them to travel as far north and inland as Toronto. Kennedy also notes that if "Toronto had been about to face a blizzard, or was threatened by a 14-inch [36-cm] snowfall, that [sic] would have been something understandable. [...] This was different. This was the unknown, the unfamiliar, the totally unexpected crisis. Hurricanes belonged in the tropics."

== Impact ==
Deaths and damage by region
Region	Deaths	Damage	Sources
ABC islands	0	$350,000	
Grenada	0	$80,000	
Haiti	400–1,000	$500,000	
Puerto Rico	9	—N/a	
Cuba	1	—N/a	
Bahamas	6	—N/a	
United States	95	$281 million	
Canada	81	$100 million	
Total	592–1,192	$382 million	

=== Caribbean ===
On October 8, two crew members on reconnaissance aircraft were injured due to turbulence while observing Hazel; one requiring hospitalization. The ABC Islands of Aruba, Bonaire and Curaçao, located north of Venezuela, received rough winds and rains of up to 9.8 inches (250 mm) when the intensifying cyclone passed to the north. Flash flooding in Aruba and Curaçao destroyed a bridge and several water dams and resulted in losses of $350,000 (1954 USD). Puerto Rico suffered its worst flooding since 1899 as a result of the hurricane. Due to timely warnings, only nine people were killed (eight by drowning and one by a landslide), but infrastructure, buildings, and agricultural areas suffered serious damage, and over 11,000 people were evacuated from flooded areas.

In Haiti, Hazel brought flash floods which destroyed numerous villages, and high winds which caused considerable damage to major cities. The death toll was estimated to be as high as 1,000 people; most of the casualties drowned when the water flowed in a flood down the mountains, some of which were as high as 2,400 m (8,000 ft). The situation was exacerbated by deforestation, which lessened the ability of the soil to hold water. Haiti's South Peninsula took the brunt of the storm: the largest town, Aux Cayes, reported at least 200 casualties, while the second-largest town of Jérémie was reported to have been swept into the sea, with at least 200 more casualties. Damage in Aux Cayes was estimated to be $500,000 (1954 USD). Estimates of people left homeless in the wake of Hazel are as high as 100,000. Hazel destroyed about 40 percent of the coffee trees and 50 percent of the cacao crop, affecting the country's economy for several years. Objects from Haiti, such as bowls, were reported to have been transported by the hurricane to the Carolinian coast.

West of Haiti, the hurricane brought hurricane-force winds to Cuba. A fisherman on the eastern tip of Cuba was killed by rough seas while trying to secure his boats. Since the hurricane passed largely east of the Bahamas, only minor damage was reported there. Hazel passed directly over Inagua, where it claimed six lives when a sailboat capsized while taking shelter from the storm.

=== United States ===
In South Carolina, the storm produced 10–11 ft (3.0–3.4 m) tides along the coast. Hundreds of buildings were destroyed, including about 80 percent of waterfront dwellings in Myrtle Beach. As a result of the high storm surge, the low-lying sandy barrier islands were completely flooded. Two piers in Myrtle Beach were damaged. In North Myrtle Beach, a three-story hotel and an 800 ft (240 m) pier were washed out to sea. At Cherry Grove Beach, 75 residences were demolished, while at Pawleys Island, 40 homes were destroyed, while numerous others were damaged. One death occurred in South Carolina. Damage in the state totaled about $27 million.

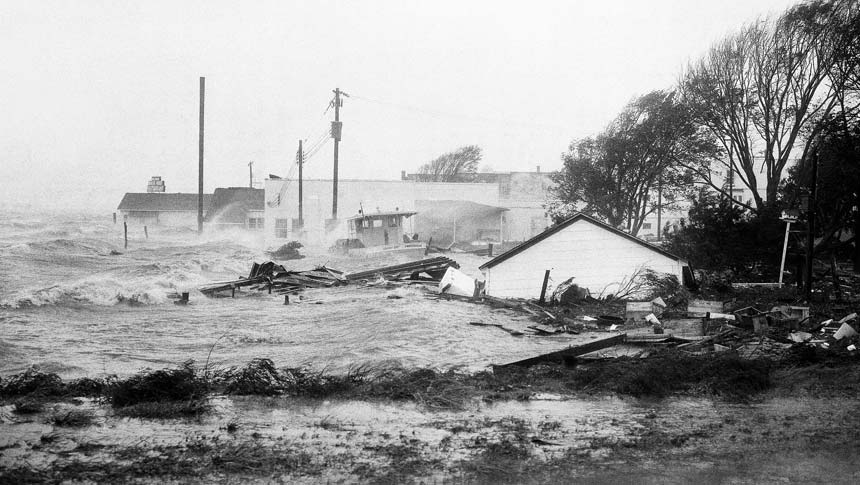
Storm surge in Morehead City, North Carolina, during Hazel

At landfall, the hurricane brought a storm surge of over 5.5 m (18 ft) to a large area of coastline, producing severe coastal damage; the damage was greater since the hurricane coincided with the highest lunar tide of the year. Brunswick County, North Carolina, suffered the heaviest damage, where most coastal dwellings were either destroyed or severely damaged. For example, in Long Beach, North Carolina, only five of the 357 buildings were left standing.

The official report from the Weather Bureau in Raleigh, North Carolina stated that as a result of Hazel, "all traces of civilization on the immediate waterfront between the state line and Cape Fear were practically annihilated." According to NOAA, "every pier in a distance of 170 miles [270 km] of coastline was demolished". At the Raleigh-Durham Airport in North Carolina, gusts of 90 mph (140 km/h) were recorded; in surrounding cities, including Kinston, Goldsboro, and Faison, wind gusts were estimated to have reached 120 mph (190 km/h).

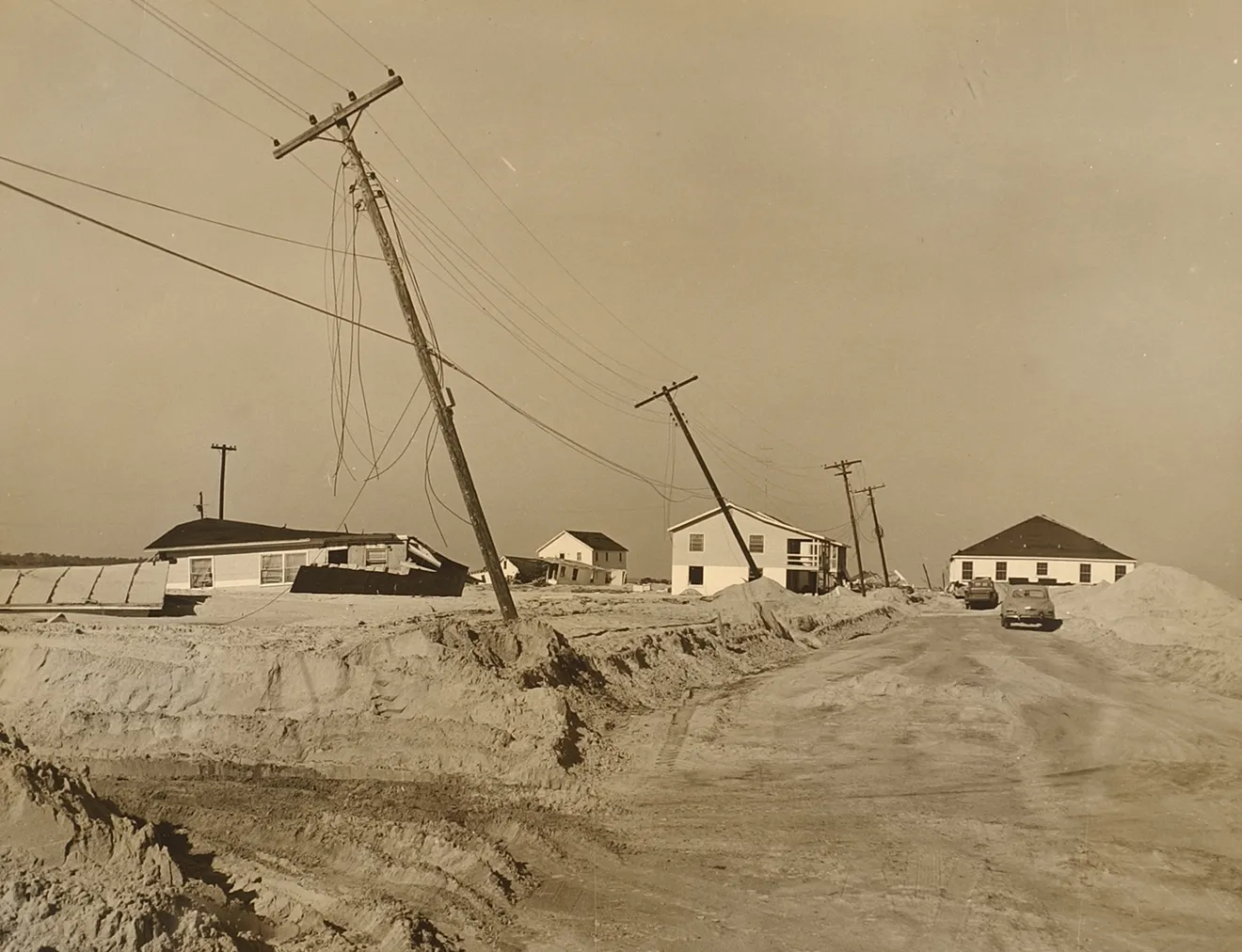
Leaning telephone poles at Carolina Beach after Hazel

With such high winds state-wide, heavy damage was caused to forests, and to property as a result of falling trees. However, since the Carolinas, like the rest of the Southeastern United States, were suffering from a severe drought, the heavy rainfall brought by Hazel was welcome. In North Carolina, the most rain was received in the interior of the state: Robbins received 286 mm (11.3 in) of rain, and Carthage received 247 mm (9.7 in).

Nineteen people were killed in North Carolina, with several hundred more injured; 15,000 homes were destroyed and another 39,000 were damaged. The number of people left homeless by the storm was "uncounted thousands". Damages in the Carolinas amounted to $163 million, with $61 million incurred by beachfront property. Total damage in the United States ranged from $281 million to $308 million.

While Hazel caused the most damage in the Carolinas, the storm did not lose all of its intensity. Going north, Hazel turned extratropical by midday when it merged with a cold front; however, it retained hurricane-strength winds and it continued to drop heavy rainfall.

In Virginia, wind gusts of over 100 mph (160 km/h) were observed at the Weather Bureau office in Norfolk. Roofs were blown off, trees and power lines were toppled, windows were shattered, and awnings were torn. The naval station suffered mainly minor damage to its temporary installations. The tugboat Indian, carrying five barges, sank in the James River; four of the eight crew members drowned. One building was demolished and several others were damaged in Portsmouth. The ferry Princess Anne was beached into the docks at Kiptopeke. An unfinished vessel at the Newport News Shipbuilding in Newport News broke from its moorings and was swept into the shore of the James River. The roof of the customs house was detached and landed on the street. In Richmond, 200 store fronts were damaged, while part of the steeple at Trinity Methodist Church was toppled. Additionally, a 150 ft (46 m) microwave tower in Warsaw was knocked over. Approximately 50 percent of residents in Virginia lost telephone and electrical service for six days. The storm damaged approximately 18,000 homes and businesses. Overall, there were 12 deaths and about $15 million in damage.

After North Carolina, the storm went through Virginia, West Virginia, Maryland, Delaware, New Jersey, Pennsylvania, and New York. In general, power was knocked out and trees were downed. Wind gusts throughout the area reached 160 km/h (99 mph).

Though not near the center, a gust of 182 km/h (113 mph) was recorded in Battery Park, the highest wind speed ever recorded within the municipal boundaries of New York City.

Rain amounts were heavier on the western side of the storm. In West Virginia, the average amount of rain received was 230 mm (9 in) with localized amounts of 300 mm (12 in) reported in the Appalachians. To the north in Pittsburgh, only 90 mm (3.5 in) of rain was reported.

To the east, the Washington, D.C. area was particularly affected, and considerable flooding was reported in the Virginias and Maryland. Much of the grounds of the Naval Academy in Annapolis were flooded, putting midshipmen to work the next day to clean up the debris. New Jersey escaped major flooding as the high tide was low enough, but to the south in Chesapeake Bay, the majority of crab pots were destroyed. Hazel lost a considerable amount of moisture when crossing the Allegheny Mountains, which raised rivers and streams in the Pittsburgh area significantly above the flood mark. In Pennsylvania, the winds were still high enough to unroof several homes.

In upstate New York, the storm blocked highways and railroads. The 491-foot (150 m) tower of television station WTVE in Elmira was toppled by wind gusts; the station was off the air for 19 months.

=== Canada ===
Deadliest Canada hurricanes
Rank	Hurricane	Season	Fatalities
1	"Newfoundland (1)"	1775	4,000–4,163†
2	"Nova Scotia (1)"	1873	600†
3	"Nova Scotia (3)"	1927	173–192†
4	"Labrador"	1882	140
5	Hazel	1954	81
6	"Newfoundland (2)"	1883	80
7	"Nova Scotia (2)"	1926	55–58†
8	"Galveston"	1900	52–232†
9	"Newfoundland (3)"	1935	50†
10	"Saxby Gale"	1869	37+
† – Estimated total
Source: NOAA

After weeks of unusually high rainfall saturated the Greater Toronto Area, Hazel dropped additional rainfall, peaking at 8.4 in (214 mm) in Snelgrove, Ontario. In three hours, the city received 3.5 in (90 mm) of precipitation. Most of these rains ran off into rivers and creeks of Toronto, which raised water levels by as much as 20–26 ft (6–8 m). Not built to withstand heavy flooding, Toronto's infrastructure took a heavy hit: over 50 bridges, many parts of important highways, as well as numerous roads and railways were destroyed when the high water washed them out or carried debris and smashed them.

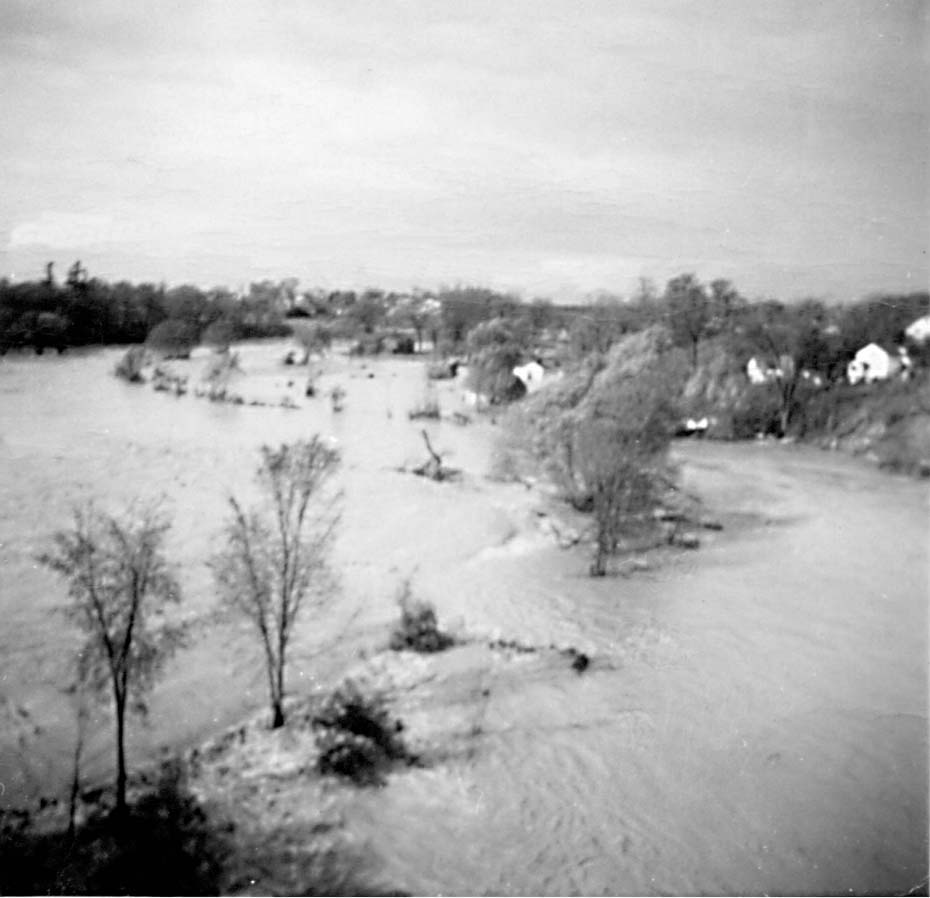
The Weston Golf Club in Toronto was left submerged after the Humber River overflowed its banks.

Floodwaters slowly rose in the Holland Marsh – a bowl-shaped valley near Bradford – allowing people to escape to the town. Highway 400, which passes through the marsh, was under as much as 10 ft (3 m) of water in some places when as much 6 m (20 ft) of water backed up. Much of the crops in the area were either swept away or ruined. After the water pumps failed due to debris, better equipment allowed the Holland Marsh to be drained by November 13. The Humber River in the west end of Toronto caused the most destruction as a result of an intense flash flood after most minor rivers and creeks drained into it. A team of five volunteer firefighters were killed when their fire truck was swept away as they were responding to help a stranded motorist. Communities in the Humber floodplain were devastated. In Woodbridge, the river swelled from its usual width of 20 m (66 ft) at its narrowest point to 107 m (351 ft), and left hundreds homeless and nine dead. The Humber swept away 366 m (1,201 ft) of Raymore Drive and 14 nearby homes, killing 35 people out of the 81 Canadian fatalities. The rise of the river was unprecedented and the residents did not evacuate, which led to the high death toll. The Etobicoke Creek also overflowed its banks at the village of Long Branch, killing seven people after many dwellings were swept into Lake Ontario.

The death toll of 81 people has not since been equaled by a natural disaster in Canada. In addition to the casualties, over 4,000 families were left homeless. The Department of Public Safety and Emergency Preparedness Canada estimates the total cost of Hurricane Hazel for Canada, taking into account long-term effects such as economic disruption, the cost of lost property, and recovery costs, to be C$1.03 billion in 2004 dollars (1.59 billion in 2024 dollars).

== Aftermath ==
=== Haiti ===
In the aftermath of Hazel, a three-day period of national mourning was declared in Haiti for hurricane victims. With existing infrastructure already poor, the recovery was very slow since many of the few existing roads were blocked, and communications equipment was either out, damaged, or destroyed. The Haitian Red Cross appealed for assistance to the International Red Cross, while the American Red Cross made a donation of $25,000 (1954 USD). Pan American World Airways offered the use of its planes to assist with the delivery of aid, and the US aircraft carrier USS Saipan deployed 18 helicopters to help deliver supplies. Despite the relief effort, there was an outbreak of typhoid fever following Hazel due to a lack of clean water.

=== United States ===
In the Carolinas, the National Guard was mobilized by the evening of October 15 to prevent looting along affected areas of the coastline. On October 17, President Dwight D. Eisenhower declared a "major disaster" in the Carolinas, and offered "immediate and unlimited federal assistance." Recovery was quick, and by October 24, all but two units were demobilized. Another concern was the rebuilding of the sand dunes along waterfronts. An artificial sand dune barrier, 39 km (24 mi) long, was completed by October 30, which in the long run led to a more rapid natural build-up of larger dunes.

With Myrtle Beach a popular tourist destination, the Chamber of Commerce began an information campaign to inform the public, which might have erroneously concluded from the massive media coverage that the city had been destroyed, that the city would be ready for the coming summer. The rebuilding after the partial destruction would transform Myrtle Beach from a "quaint summer colony to a high-rise resort city".

=== Canada ===
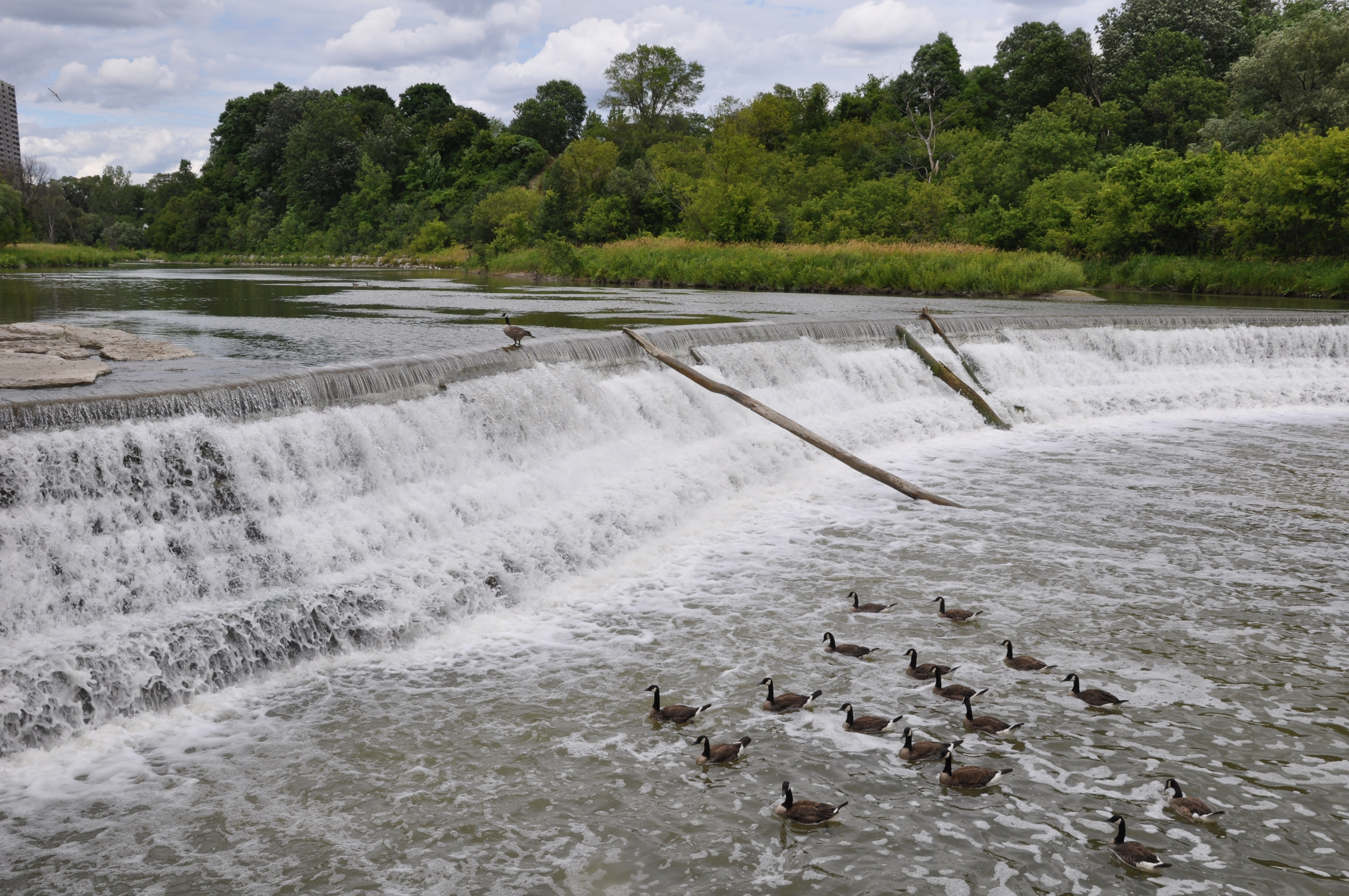
A weir was built on the Humber River near Raymore Drive to lessen the risk of a similar catastrophic flood.

The army sent about 800 soldiers to Toronto to assist with the cleanup, providing blankets and mattresses. Toronto residents helped out with the relief effort: the Salvation Army received so many donations of clothes, footwear, blankets, food, and money that its storage facilities were overfilled, forcing it to advise against further donations until they were needed. A Hurricane Relief Fund was established to coordinate financial donations, ultimately raising about $5.3 million (CAD). The fund received donations from organisations, companies, and individuals including Pope Pius XII, the Ford Motor Company of Canada, the United Church of Canada, Laura Secord Candy Shops, and the British-American Oil Company. A portion of the fund was set aside as a contingency reserve in the event of unresolved claims and also toward administrative expenses.

The Toronto and Region Conservation Authority was created after the storm to manage the area's floodplains and rivers, such as building dams. The heavily flooded areas were expropriated and barred from having homes, and most of the land was later converted into an extensive park system along Toronto's rivers. A footbridge dedicated to the victims crosses the Humber River in Raymore Park, which was the former Raymore Drive.

=== Retirement ===
As a result of the high death toll and catastrophic damage in the Caribbean, United States and Canada, the name Hazel was removed from the tropical storm naming list for 10 years, and then retired permanently in the spring of 1969, without being reused, as the hurricane was still an active subject of research. It will never again be used for an Atlantic hurricane.

== See also ==
- List of North Carolina hurricanes (1950–1979)
- List of Canadian hurricanes
- Hurricane Isabel (2003)- Caused similar impact on North Carolina and Virginia, just 49 years after the Hazel.
- Hurricane Sandy – a similar storm in 2012 with an unusual and complicated track due to baroclinic interactions
- Hurricane Matthew – a storm which took a similar track in the Caribbean in 2016
- Hurricane Fiona - a strong Category 4 storm which impacted Atlantic Canada
