= 1927 Nova Scotia hurricane =

Category 3 Atlantic hurricane in 1927

1927 Nova Scotia Hurricane
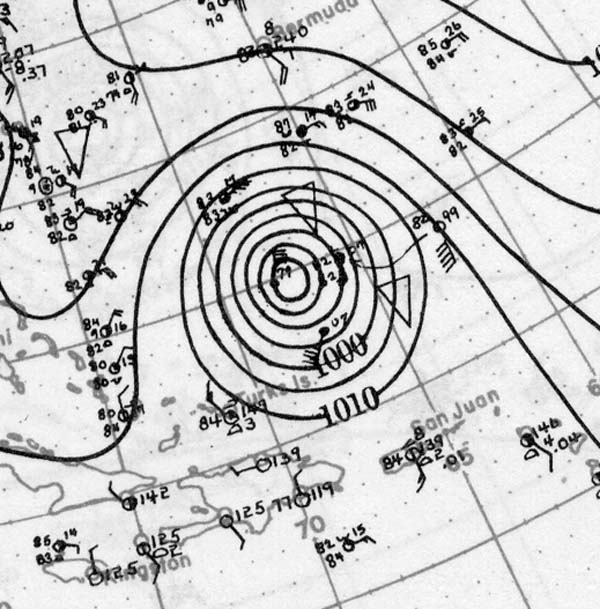
- Surface weather analysis of the hurricane on August 22

Meteorological history
- Formed: August 18, 1927
- Extratropical: August 25, 1927
- Dissipated: August 29, 1927

Category 3 major hurricane
- 1-minute sustained (SSHWS/NWS)
- Highest winds: 125 mph (205 km/h)
- Lowest pressure: 950 mbar (hPa); 28.05 inHg

Overall effects
- Fatalities: 173–192
- Damage: $1.6 million (1927 USD)
- Areas affected: New England, Atlantic Canada
- IBTrACS
- Part of the 1927 Atlantic hurricane season

The 1927 Nova Scotia hurricane (also known as the 1927 Great August Gale or the Great Gale of August 24) was the deadliest tropical cyclone striking Canada in the 20th century. The first observed storm of the season, this cyclone developed from a tropical wave over the deep tropics of the Atlantic Ocean on August 18. Initially a tropical storm, it moved west-northwestward and intensified into a Category 1 hurricane on the modern day Saffir–Simpson hurricane wind scale by August 19. The storm intensified significantly over the next few days, and by August 22, it peaked as a Category 3 hurricane with maximum sustained winds of 125 mph (205 km/h). Around that time, the system began curving northwestward and later northward. By August 23, it turned to the north-northeast and then began weakening on August 24. Thereafter, the storm accelerated toward Atlantic Canada. Late on August 24, the hurricane struck near Yarmouth, Nova Scotia, as a Category 2 hurricane, just before becoming extratropical.

In New England, rainfall caused minor street flooding, especially in central Massachusetts and Maine, where 2.09 inches (53 mm) of precipitation fell in the city of Portland. Of the 173–192 fatalities in Canada, most of them occurred due to damaged or missing ships, with two boats losing their entire crew. On land, Nova Scotia was impacted most significantly. Heavy rainfall washed out 20–25 percent of the rail lines, which disrupted rail service. Flooding also damaged numerous roads and swept away bridges, making traveling difficult. Crop damage from the hurricane was severe as the storm destroyed about half of the fruit, vegetable, and hay harvest, leaving a loss of $1 million (1927 USD). (Note: All damage figures were converted from 1927 CAD to 1927 USD using the exchange rates listed in the September 1927 Federal Reserve Bulletin.) Property damage in the province was in the thousands of dollars range. There were many electrical and telephone service outages. The storm's rains and winds caused similar but less severe damage in the provinces of New Brunswick, Prince Edward Island, and Newfoundland. Overall, the hurricane caused just under $1.6 million in damage.

== Meteorological history ==
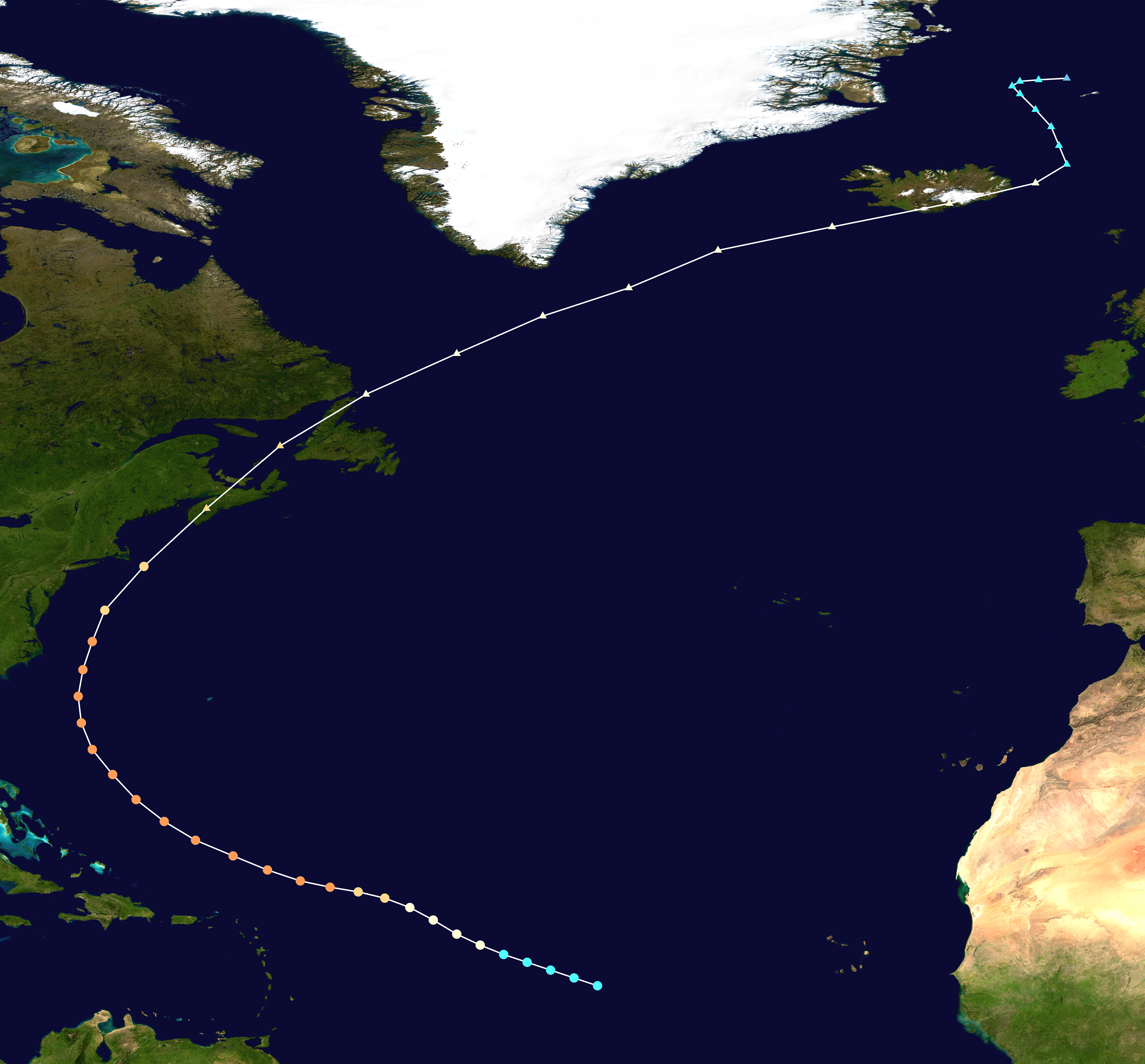
Map plotting the storm's track and intensity, according to the Saffir–Simpson scale Map key Saffir–Simpson scale Tropical depression (≤38 mph, ≤62 km/h) Tropical storm (39–73 mph, 63–118 km/h) Category 1 (74–95 mph, 119–153 km/h) Category 2 (96–110 mph, 154–177 km/h) Category 3 (111–129 mph, 178–208 km/h) Category 4 (130–156 mph, 209–251 km/h) Category 5 (≥157 mph, ≥252 km/h) Unknown Storm type Tropical cyclone Subtropical cyclone Extratropical cyclone, remnant low, tropical disturbance, or monsoon depression

The Atlantic hurricane database indicates that a tropical wave became a tropical storm about 1,020 mi (1,640 km) east of the southernmost islands of Cabo Verde at 12:00 UTC on August 18. Moving west-northwestward, it intensified into a Category 1 hurricane on the modern day Saffir–Simpson hurricane wind scale by August 19. The storm deepened significantly over the next few days, becoming a Category 2 late on August 20 and reaching Category 3 at 06:00 UTC on August 21. The cyclone peaked as a Category 3 hurricane with sustained winds of 125 mph (205 km/h) and a minimum pressure of 950 mbar (28 inHg) around 06:00 UTC on August 22. The latter was observed by the S.S. Maraval, while the former was estimated using the pressure-wind relationship. Around that time, the system began curving northwestward and later northward. By August 23, it turned to the north-northeast and then began weakening on August 24, falling to Category 2 intensity by 12:00 UTC.

Thereafter, the storm accelerated toward Atlantic Canada. Around 18:00 UTC on August 24, the hurricane made its closest approach to the United States, passing about 60 mi (100 km) southeast of Nantucket island in Massachusetts. About five hours later, the system struck near Yarmouth, Nova Scotia, as a Category 2 hurricane with winds of 105 mph (165 km/h). Based on distribution of rainfall over Nova Scotia, the storm was believed to have made landfall as a tropical cyclone. By 00:00 UTC on August 25, the hurricane transitioned into an extratropical cyclone. The remnants moved quickly east-northeastward, striking Newfoundland and later Iceland, before dissipating near Jan Mayen on August 29.

== Preparations and impact ==
Shipping ahead of the hurricane received repeated warnings broadcast by both American and Canadian weather officials. Small craft warnings and a hurricane warning for New York City were also issued. However, the majority of fishing vessels in Atlantic Canada in this period did not have radios, leaving the large fishing fleet on the offshore banks unaware of the approaching disaster.

Because of the fast forward speed of the hurricane, the damage was minimal in New England. However, the hurricane was devastating in Atlantic Canada as the storm caused tremendous damage and 173-192 fatalities, most of which were at sea. The hurricane was the deadliest tropical cyclone (or remnants) in Canada at least since a hurricane in 1900.

=== New England ===
Rainfall from the hurricane caused flooding portions of New England, especially Maine and Massachusetts. In the latter, up to 3 in (76 mm) of precipitation was recorded in Lawrence, a daily record for the city. Dirt roads were washed out, forcing evacuations, while a 50 ft (15 m) stone wall collapsed. Damage reached the thousands of dollars range. In nearby Shawsheen Village, a pond overflowed, inundating yards and streets. Rainfall from the hurricane contributed to causing the Taunton River to reach its then-highest known crest at some locations, forcing floodgates to be opened. Route 24 was inundated with over 1 ft (0.30 m) of water, while several other roads were also flooded. Street cars stalled or were delayed as long as 45 minutes. About a half-dozen locations along the New York, New Haven and Hartford Railroad from Brockton to Middleborough were inundated with between 6 and 10 in (150 and 250 mm) of water, resulting in a difficult passage of trains over the low-lying grades. In Maine, precipitation up to 2 in (50.8 mm) was reported across the state, causing isolated street flooding. In Eastport, a weather station reported a low pressure of 983 mbar (29.0 inHg). Offshore, the hurricane damaged a fishing ship, leaving one dead and three injured.

=== Atlantic Canada ===
Deadliest Canada hurricanes
Rank	Hurricane	Season	Fatalities
1	"Newfoundland (1)"	1775	4,000–4,163†
2	"Nova Scotia (1)"	1873	600†
3	"Nova Scotia (3)"	1927	173–192†
4	"Labrador"	1882	140
5	Hazel	1954	81
6	"Newfoundland (2)"	1883	80
7	"Nova Scotia (2)"	1926	55–58†
8	"Galveston"	1900	52–232†
9	"Newfoundland (3)"	1935	50†
10	"Saxby Gale"	1869	37+
† – Estimated total
Source: NOAA

Vessels lost during the 1927 hurricane
Ship name	Crew lost
John C. Loughlin	23–28
Loretta	23–28
Valena	23–28
Vienna	23–28
Columbia	23
Joyce Smith	22–24
Clayton Walters	21–22
Mahala	20
Uda R. Corkum	19
Hilda Gertrude	8
Annie Healey	7
Unnamed schooner	7
Ella	6
Unnamed skiff	6
Stanley Hubley	4
McLaughlan	2
Mystery II	2
Sligo	2
Julie Oppall	1
Mary Bernice	1
Noxall	1
Annie Jean	All
Haligonian	All
Total	175–183+

Nova Scotia received heavy rainfall up to 4 in (102 mm) and gale-force winds. The hardest hit area was Harbourville and adjacent settlements along the "Bay Shore" coastline of the Bay of Fundy. There the hurricane completely destroyed a gravel road which had been built shortly before the storm's impact. Another road connecting to a hotel was also severely damaged. Heavy rainfall brought by the hurricane caused landslides and flooding along the Harbourville Mountain which washed out numerous roads. In the Annapolis Valley, the rainfall fell so quickly that drainage ditches and small creeks overflowed. In Lakeville, flooding washed away a 25-foot (7.6 m) bridge, and fallen trees and other storm debris littered the streets and roads. The Cornwallis River overflowed its banks, causing serious flash flooding. Near Harrington's Crossing, a small creek overflowed its banks, stalling numerous automobiles. Roads were extensively impacted in Digby, Wolfville, Yarmouth, and Annapolis County, which suffered $150,000 in damage to streets alone. Overall, there was about $500,000 in damage to roads in Nova Scotia.

In Halifax, wind gusts of 48 mph (77 km/h) were observed, damaging a grain elevator. Heavy rainfall washed out the railroad lines between Halifax and Yarmouth. A power plant in Pictou County suffered $500 in damage after the roof blew off. In Springhill, strong winds downed trees, fences, and houses. A warehouse in Sydney was destroyed after being tossed about 50 ft (15 m) by the wind. Throughout Nova Scotia, flooding washed out 20–25 percent of the rail lines across Nova Scotia, disrupting rail service. Flooding also damaged numerous roads and swept away bridges making traveling difficult. Crop damage from the hurricane was severe as the storm destroyed 50 percent of the fruit, vegetable, and hay harvest, leaving a loss of $1 million. Other parts of Nova Scotia received similar damage. Overall, property damage in the province was in the thousands of dollars range and there were many electrical and telephone service outages.

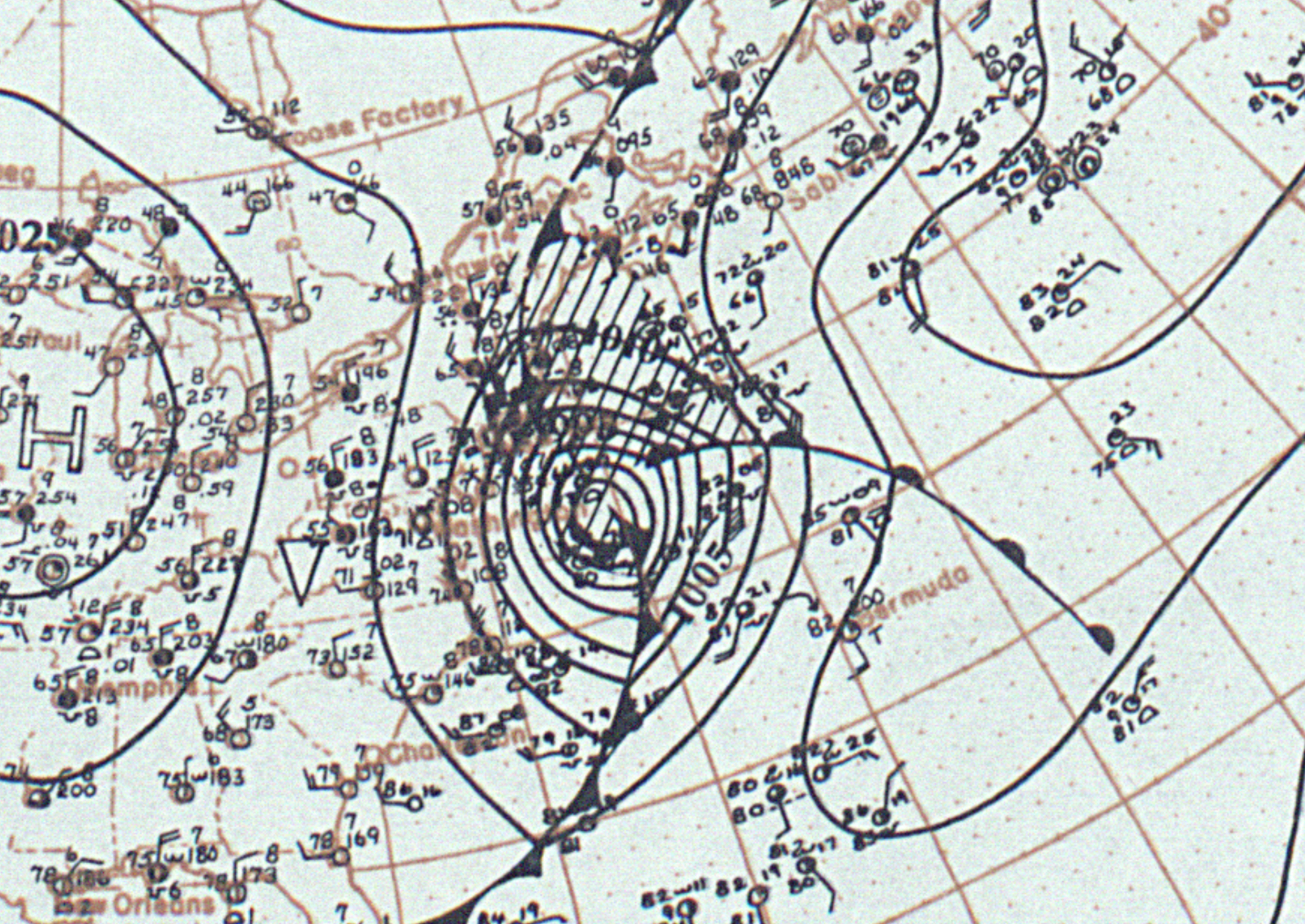
Synoptic weather map of the hurricane approaching landfall in Nova Scotia on August 24

Wind gusts in Newfoundland as strong as 90 mph (140 km/h) at the Corner Brook subdivision of Curling caused about $500 in damage to circus tents and associated equipment. In New Brunswick, precipitation peaked at 3.3 in (84 mm) in Saint John. A car tumbled into washed out culvert in Horseman's Hill, injuring three people. Several bridges and culvert were destroyed in Springhill. A dam broke near University of St. Joseph's College, severely flooding the campus and demolishing the gymnasium. Throughout the province, streets, bridges, gardens, and crops, particularly hay and grain, were damaged, while railroad lines were destroyed. Power outages and loss of telephone services were common. Damage in New Brunswick totaled at least $51,000. In Prince Edward Island, 2 in (51 mm) of rain fell in Charlottetown and winds of 30 mph (45 km/h) were observed. The city was littered with debris. Generally minor street flooding occurred. Fruit trees and crops suffered extensive damage. At the exhibition grounds, buildings and fences received about $1,000 in damage.

Offshore, seventy-five fishing boats of the Lunenburg fishing fleet were reported missing in the Grand Banks. Of the seventy-five, four vessels were reported as total losses. The Joyce Smith and Clayton Walters were the first two fishing vessels to fall victim to the hurricane. The Joyce Smith was carrying 22 men (mostly from Newfoundland) and it and the Walters were fishing off the coast of Sable Island at the time of the hurricane. The last sighting of the two fishing boats was from the crew of the Marshall Frank 27 mi (43 km) off Sable Island. Newspaper reports suggested that both fishing boats did not survive the storm and all 43 crewmen perished at sea. The Mahala, another fishing schooner, was also listed among the ships missing after the hurricane. A search in the area where the ship was reported missing turned up nothing and it was assumed that the ship sank along with its eighteen fishermen. The fourth fishing boat to be reported missing was the Uda R. Corkum, which was carrying a crew of 21 men and 1800 quintals of fish. In all, the loss from all four vessels totaled up to 80 and monetary losses from all four ships totaled over $100,000. Four more fishing boats also sank, taking 33 lives. In addition to the Canadian fishing boats, the famous U.S. racing and fishing schooner Columbia. carrying 22 crew men (many from Nova Scotia) sank during the storm off the coast of Sable Island. There were no survivors.

The Nova Scotia hurricane of 1927 followed another tragic August storm the previous year and together they became known as "The August Gales", remembered for generations as one of the worst tragedies in the fisheries of Maritime Canada. The severe shipping losses, especially among banks fishing schooners, accelerated a move to outfit Canadian schooners with motors and radios. Today, the hurricane is commemorated in a waterfront monument and an exhibit at the Fisheries Museum of the Atlantic in Lunenburg, Nova Scotia.

== See also ==
- List of Atlantic hurricanes
- List of Canada hurricanes
- 1926 Nova Scotia hurricane
- Hurricane Bill (2009)
- Hurricane Earl (2010)
