= Spectacle Island Game Sanctuary =

Wilderness area in Nova Scotia, Canada

- Spectacle Island, Toothbrush Island
- IUCN category IV (habitat/species management area)
- Location within Nova Scotia
- Location: Baddeck, Nova Scotia
- Coordinates: 46°04′45″N 60°44′06″W
- Area: 13 ha (32 acres)
- Established: June 30, 1969
- Governing body: Government of Nova Scotia

The Spectacle Island Game Sanctuary is a protected area in Baddeck, Nova Scotia, Canada. The sanctuary was established in 1969 after the island was donated to the province by Elsie Alexandra Carolyn Grosvenor Myers, on the condition that it be established as a sanctuary.

The sanctuary includes Spectacle Island, an area of less than 1 hectare, and the water extending approximately 100 metres from the island's high-water mark for a total area of 13 hectares. Hunting and trapping are prohibited on the island, and people are forbidden from entering the sanctuary from April 15 to August 15, except commercial fishers and recreational boaters travelling at a speed of less than 15 knots.

The island is home to a large cormorant colony. From 1950 to 1976, the island was known as Double Island. It is also known locally as Toothbrush Island.
