= 1927 Atlantic hurricane season =

- Season summary map

Seasonal boundaries
- First system formed: August 13, 1927
- Last system dissipated: November 21, 1927

Strongest storm
- Name: "Nova Scotia"
  - Maximum winds: 125 mph (205 km/h) (1-minute sustained)
  - Lowest pressure: 950 mbar (hPa; 28.05 inHg)

Seasonal statistics
- Total depressions: 10
- Total storms: 8
- Hurricanes: 4
- Major hurricanes (Cat. 3+): 1
- Total fatalities: 173-192
- Total damage: $1.7 million (1927 USD)

Related articles
- 1927 Pacific hurricane season; 1927 Pacific typhoon season; 1920s North Indian Ocean cyclone seasons

The 1927 Atlantic hurricane season was a relatively inactive season, with eight tropical storms, four of which became hurricanes. One of these became a major hurricane – Category 3 or higher on the modern day Saffir–Simpson scale. The first system, a tropical depression, developed on August 13, while the final cyclone, a tropical storm, merged with a cold front on November 21. No hurricane made landfall in the United States, in contrast to the four that struck the U.S. in the previous season.

The most significant storm of the season was Hurricane One, nicknamed the Nova Scotia hurricane. The sole major hurricane, this storm resulted in between 173 and 192 deaths in Atlantic Canada, mostly from capsized and missing ships offshore. On land, the storm left about $1.7 million (1927 USD) (Note: This figure was converted from $1.6 million (1927 CAD) using the exchange rates listed in the September 1927 Federal Reserve Bulletin.) in damage, with much of the damage occurring in Nova Scotia. Additionally, the fourth, fifth, and sixth tropical storms brought minor impact to Bermuda, South Carolina, and Cuba, respectively.

The season's activity was reflected with an accumulated cyclone energy (ACE) rating of 56, below the 1921–1930 average of 76.6. ACE is a metric used to express the energy used by a tropical cyclone during its lifetime. Therefore, a storm with a longer duration will have high values of ACE. It is only calculated at six-hour increments in which specific tropical and subtropical systems are either at or above sustained wind speeds of 39 mph (63 km/h), which is the threshold for tropical storm intensity. Thus, tropical depressions are not included here.

== Systems ==
=== August tropical depression ===
A low pressure area formerly associated with a weakening frontal boundary developed into a tropical depression on August 13. The depression moved rapidly east-northeastward and was soon absorbed by the frontal boundary.

=== Hurricane One ===
- Category 3 hurricane (SSHWS)
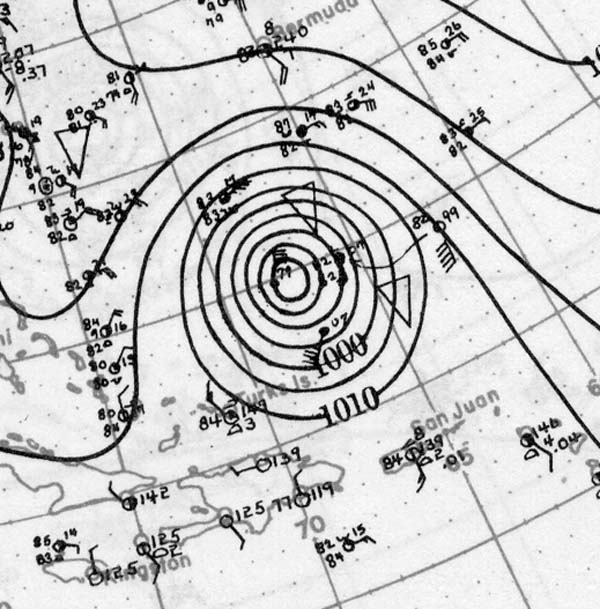
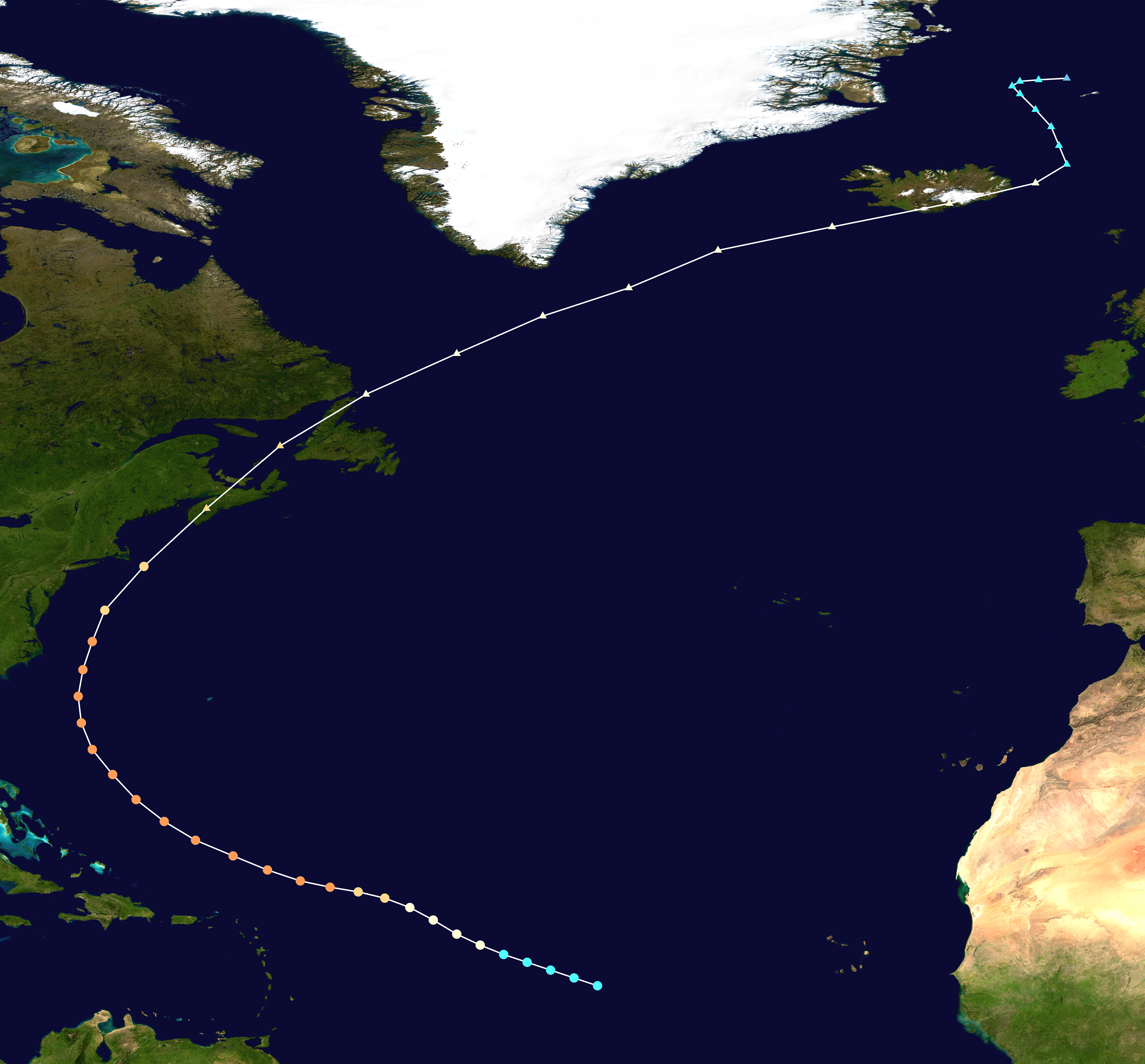
- Duration: August 18 – August 26
- Peak intensity: 125 mph (205 km/h) (1-min); 950 mbar (hPa)

The Nova Scotia Hurricane of 1927

A tropical storm developed from a tropical wave over the deep tropics of the Atlantic Ocean on August 18. Moving west-northwestward, it intensified into a Category 1 hurricane on the modern day Saffir–Simpson hurricane wind scale by August 19. The storm deepened significantly over the next few days, and by August 22, it peaked as a Category 3 hurricane with sustained winds of 125 mph (205 km/h) and a minimum pressure of 950 mbar (28 inHg). The latter was observed by the S.S. Maraval, while the former was estimated using the pressure-wind relationship. Around that time, the system began curving northwestward and later northward. By August 23, it turned to the north-northeast and then began weakening on August 24. Thereafter, the storm accelerated toward Atlantic Canada. Late on August 24, the hurricane struck near Yarmouth, Nova Scotia, as a Category 2 hurricane, just before becoming extratropical. The remnants continued northeastward, striking Newfoundland and later Iceland, before dissipating near Jan Mayen on August 29.

In New England, the storm brought heavy rainfall, peaking at 2.09 inches (53 mm) in Portland, Maine. Minor street flooding was reported in Maine, Massachusetts, and Rhode Island, with flooding in the Providence area damaging pavement and overflowing sewers. Along the coast of Massachusetts, rough seas disrupted shipping in Boston and beached a ship at Cape Cod. Of the 173-192 fatalities in Canada, most of them occurred due to damaged or missing ships, with two boats losing their entire crew. On land, heavy rainfall in Nova Scotia washed out 20–25 percent of the rail lines, which disrupted rail service. Flooding also damaged numerous roads and swept away bridges. Crop damage from the hurricane was severe as the storm destroyed about half of the fruit, vegetable, and hay harvest, leaving a loss of $1 million (1927 CAD). Property damage in the province was in the thousands of dollars range and there were many electrical and telephone service outages. Similar but less severe impact occurred in New Brunswick and Prince Edward Island. The storm also left minor wind damage in Newfoundland. Overall, the hurricane caused just under $1.6 million (1927 CAD) in damage.

=== Hurricane Two ===
- Category 1 hurricane (SSHWS)
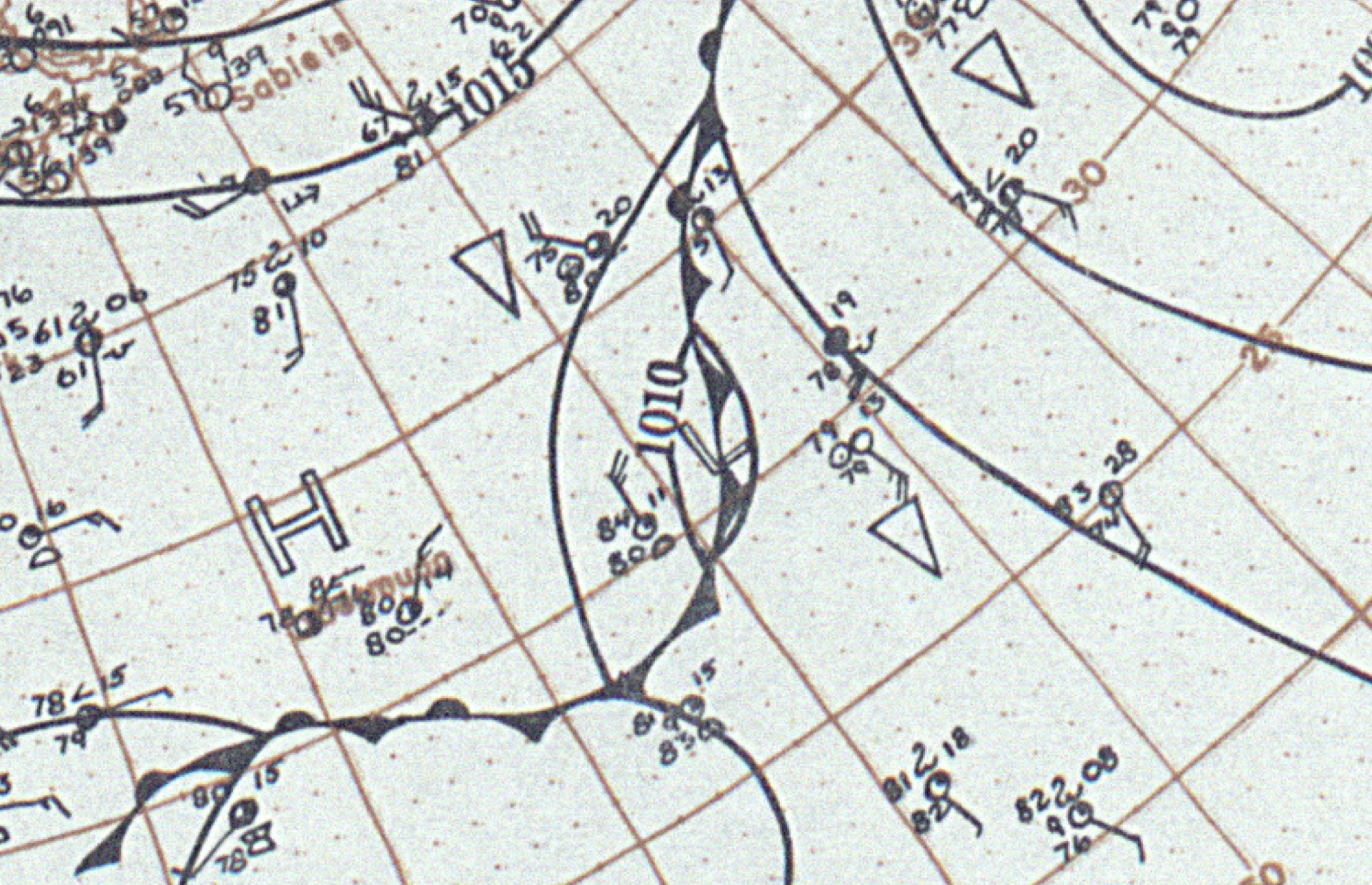
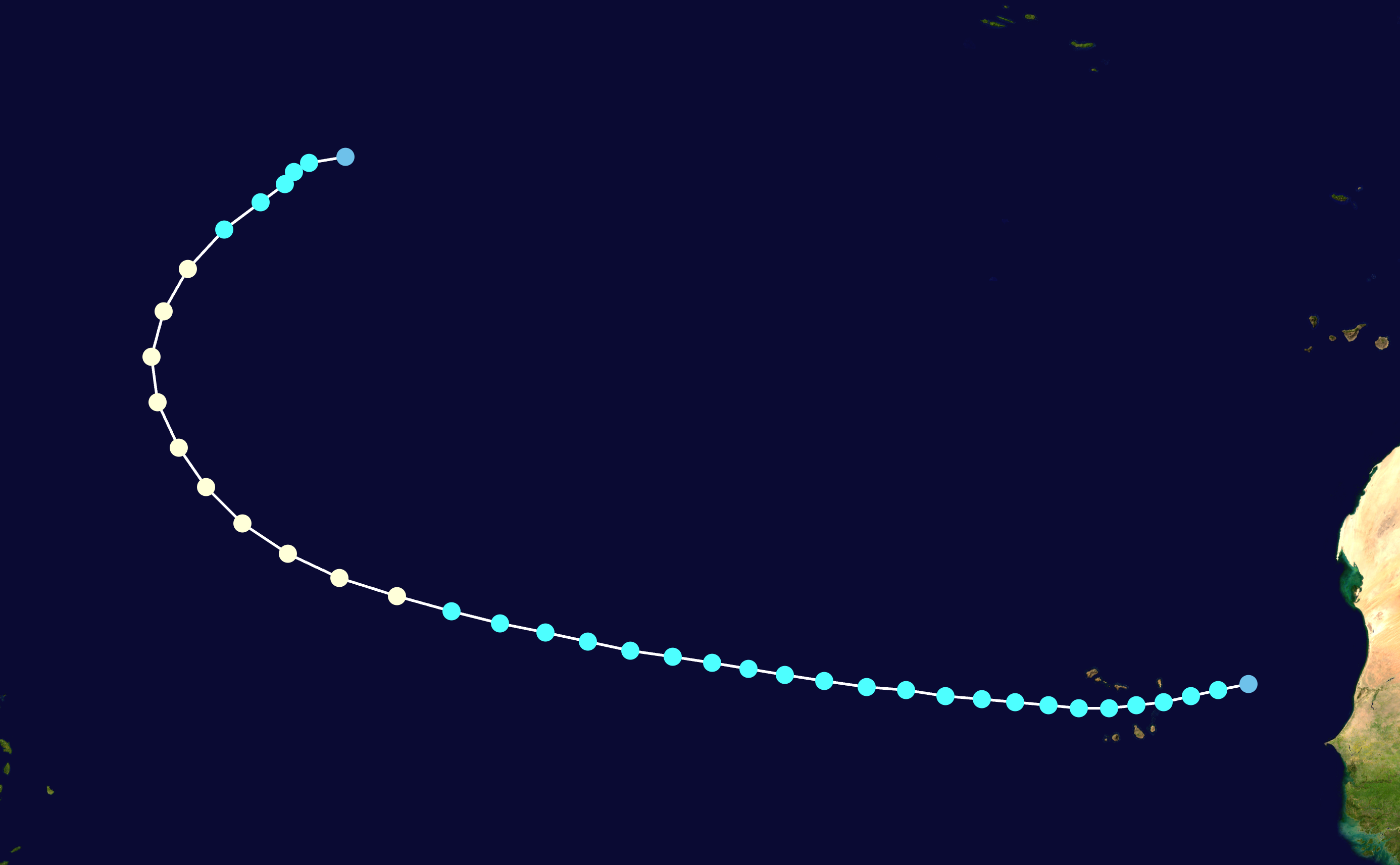
- Duration: September 2 – September 11
- Peak intensity: 90 mph (150 km/h) (1-min); 1007 mbar (hPa)

A tropical wave developed into the second tropical depression of the season on September 2, while located about 190 mi (310 km) east of the Cape Verde Islands. Six hours after forming, the depression intensified into a tropical storm. Moving west-southwestward, the storm passed through the Cape Verde Islands on September 3, striking Boa Vista with winds of 45 mph (75 km/h). The island of Santiago observed winds of 40 mph (64 km/h) at 12:00 UTC. Thereafter, the system headed west-northwestward into the open Atlantic and slowly intensified. Early on September 8, the storm strengthened into a Category 1 while beginning a northwestward motion. Around that time, a radiogram from the British S.S. Socrates indicated that the ship recorded a barometric pressure of 1,007 mbar (29.7 inHg), the lowest observed in association with the storm.

By September 9, the hurricane peaked with maximum sustained winds of 90 mph (150 km/h) and began curving north-northwestward, which was soon followed by a turn to the north-northeast later that day. Thereafter, the storm started to lose tropical characteristics, with historical weather maps indicating a low pressure area imbedded within a cold front by September 10. Around 12:00 UTC, the cyclone weakened to a tropical storm. Late on September 11, the storm weakened to a tropical depression and was last noted at 18:00 UTC, while located about 870 mi (1,400 km) east-northeast of Bermuda.

=== Hurricane Three ===
- Category 1 hurricane (SSHWS)
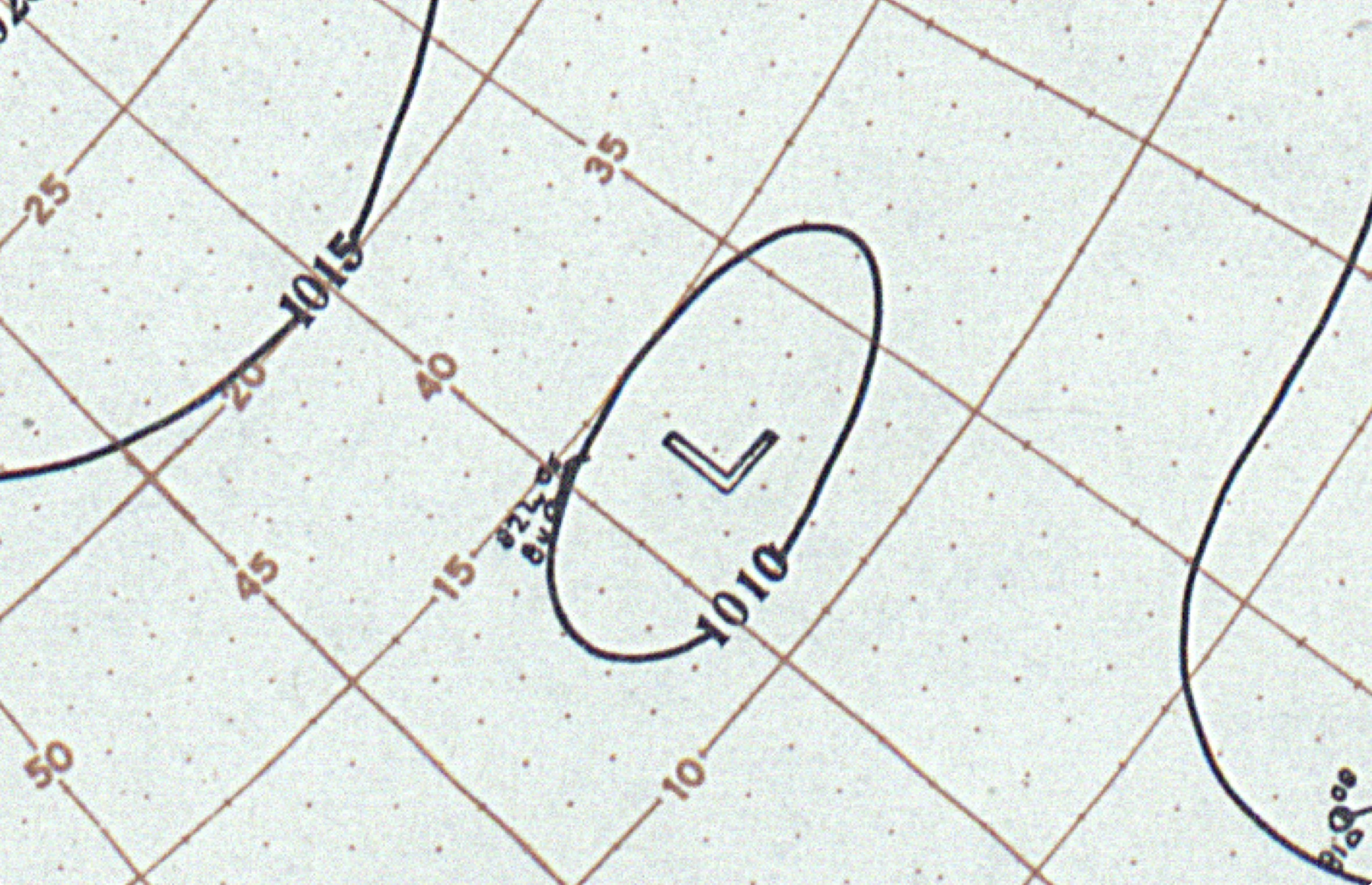
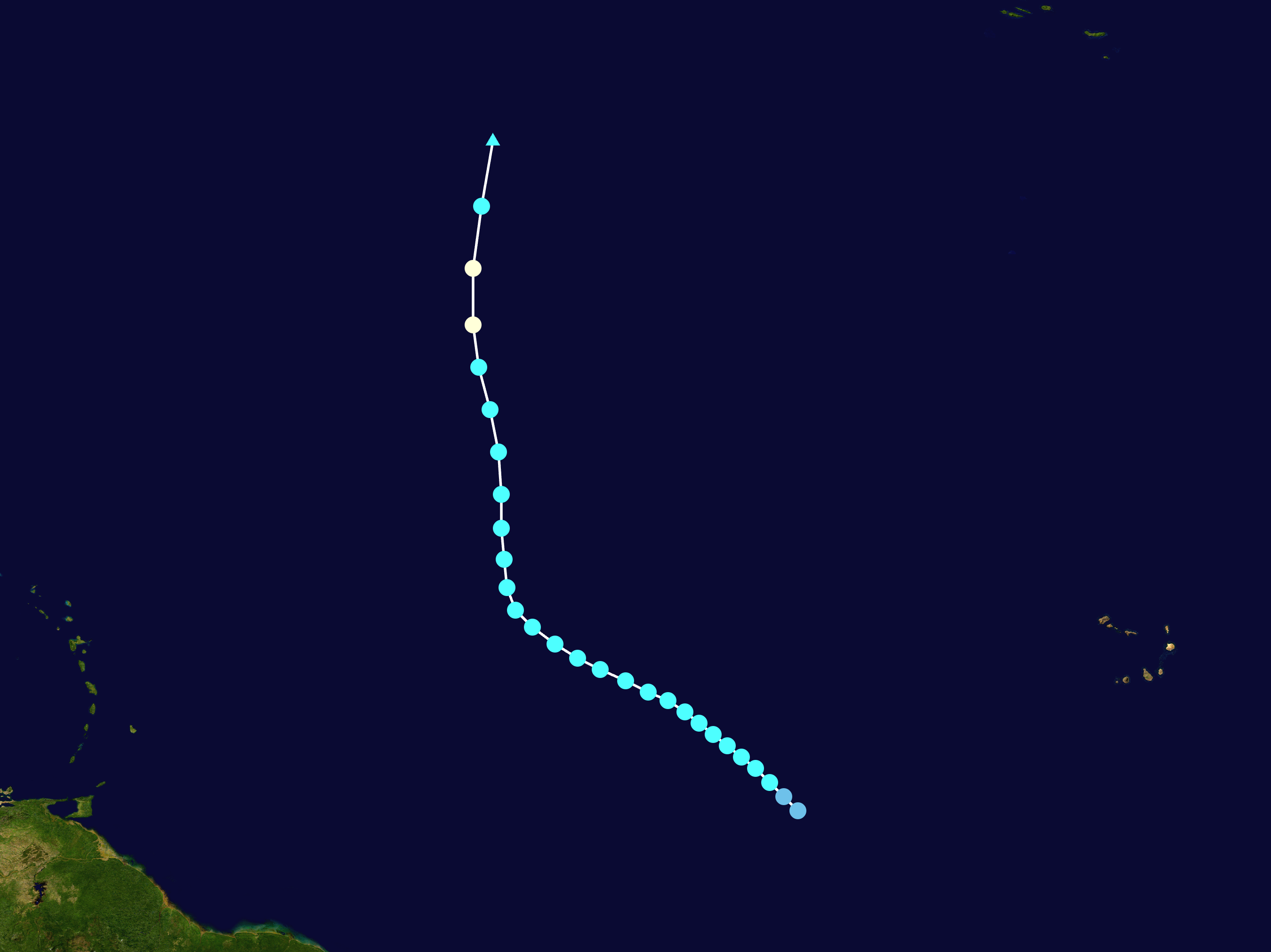
- Duration: September 22 – September 29
- Peak intensity: 80 mph (130 km/h) (1-min); 1005 mbar (hPa)

A low pressure area developed into a tropical depression around 12:00 UTC on September 22 while located about 820 mi (1,320 km) southwest of the southwesternmost islands of Cape Verde. Moving northwestward, the depression strengthened into a tropical storm by early on September 23. Thereafter, the storm proceeded to intensify very slowly during the next several days. On September 26, the cyclone began moving generally northward. Based on a ship report, the storm finally reached hurricane status by 12:00 UTC on September 28. A different ship observation indicated a minimum barometric pressure of 1,005 mbar (29.7 inHg). Based on the pressure-wind relationship, it is estimated that the storm peaked with maximum sustained winds of 80 mph (130 km/h). Early on September 29, the hurricane weakened to a tropical storm and became extratropical six hours later, while situated about 935 mi (1,505 km) south-southeast of Cape Race, Newfoundland.

=== Hurricane Four ===
- Category 2 hurricane (SSHWS)
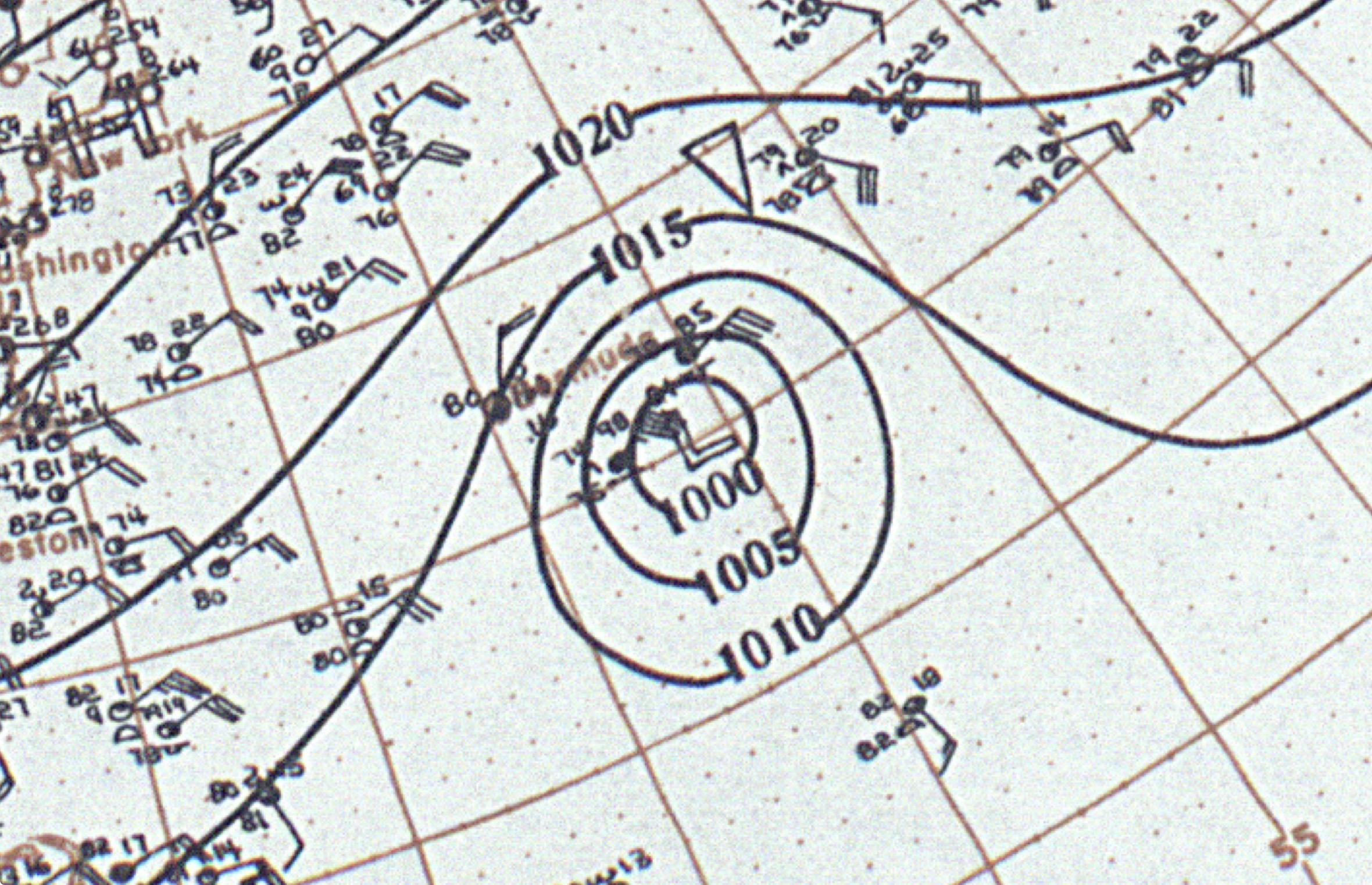
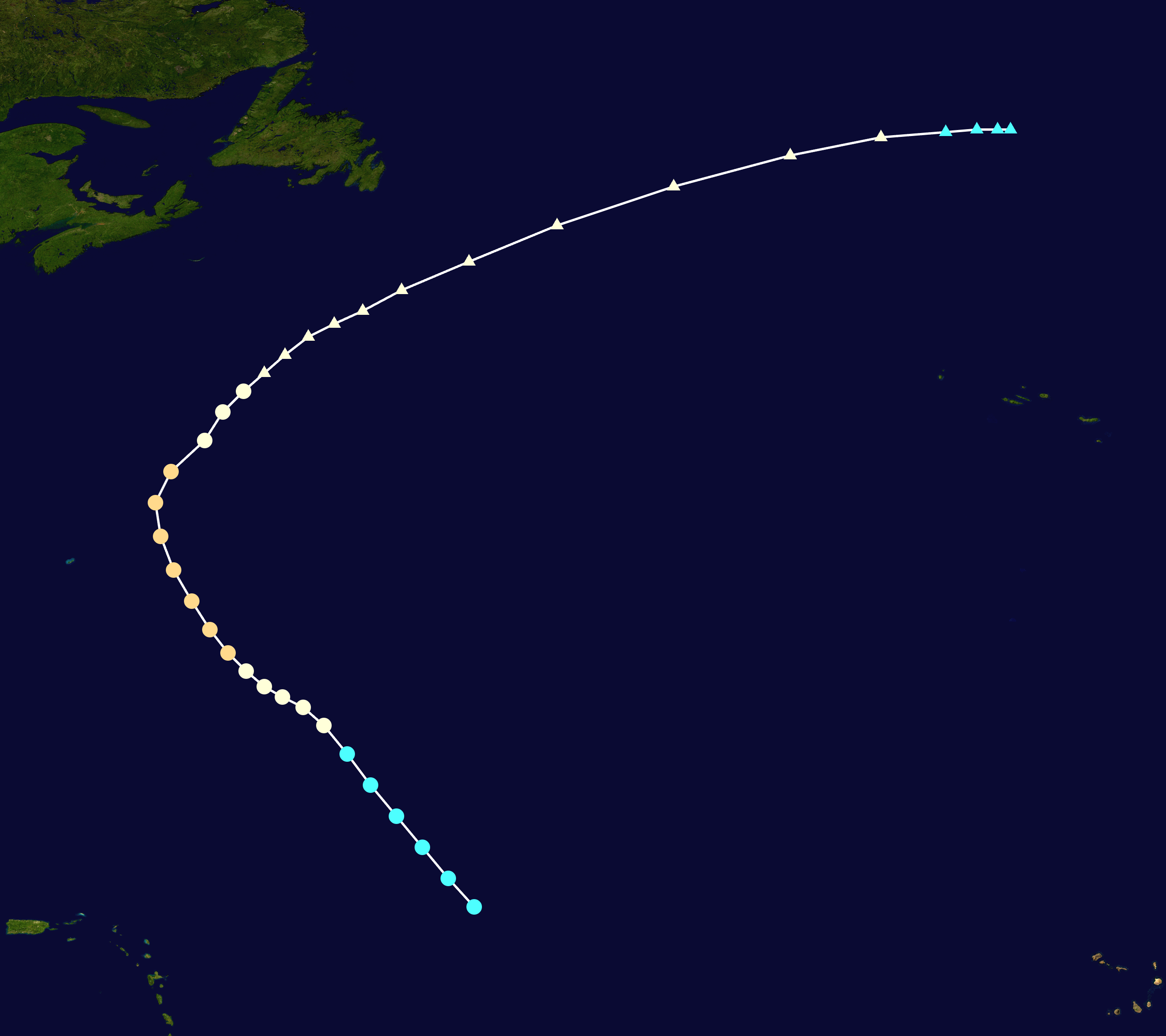
- Duration: September 23 – September 28
- Peak intensity: 110 mph (175 km/h) (1-min); 967 mbar (hPa)

A low pressure area developed into a tropical storm about 835 mi (1,345 km) east-northeast of Barbuda early on September 23. The system moved northwest, and by 12:00 UTC on September 24, it strengthened into a Category 1 hurricane. Late on September 25, the cyclone intensified into a Category 2 hurricane. A ship recorded a pressure of 971 mbar (28.7 inHg) on September 26. Because this was measured within the storm's radius of maximum sustained winds, the hurricane's minimum barometric pressure was estimated to have been 967 mbar (28.6 inHg). Based on the pressure-wind relationship, the system peaked with maximum sustained winds of 110 mph (175 km/h). Thereafter, it curved northeastward on September 27, shortly before weakening to a Category 1 hurricane. Early on September 28, the hurricane became extratropical about 360 mi (580 km) south-southeast of Sable Island. However, the extratropical storm existed until October 1, when it dissipated well north of the Azores.

=== Tropical Storm Five ===
- Tropical storm (SSHWS)
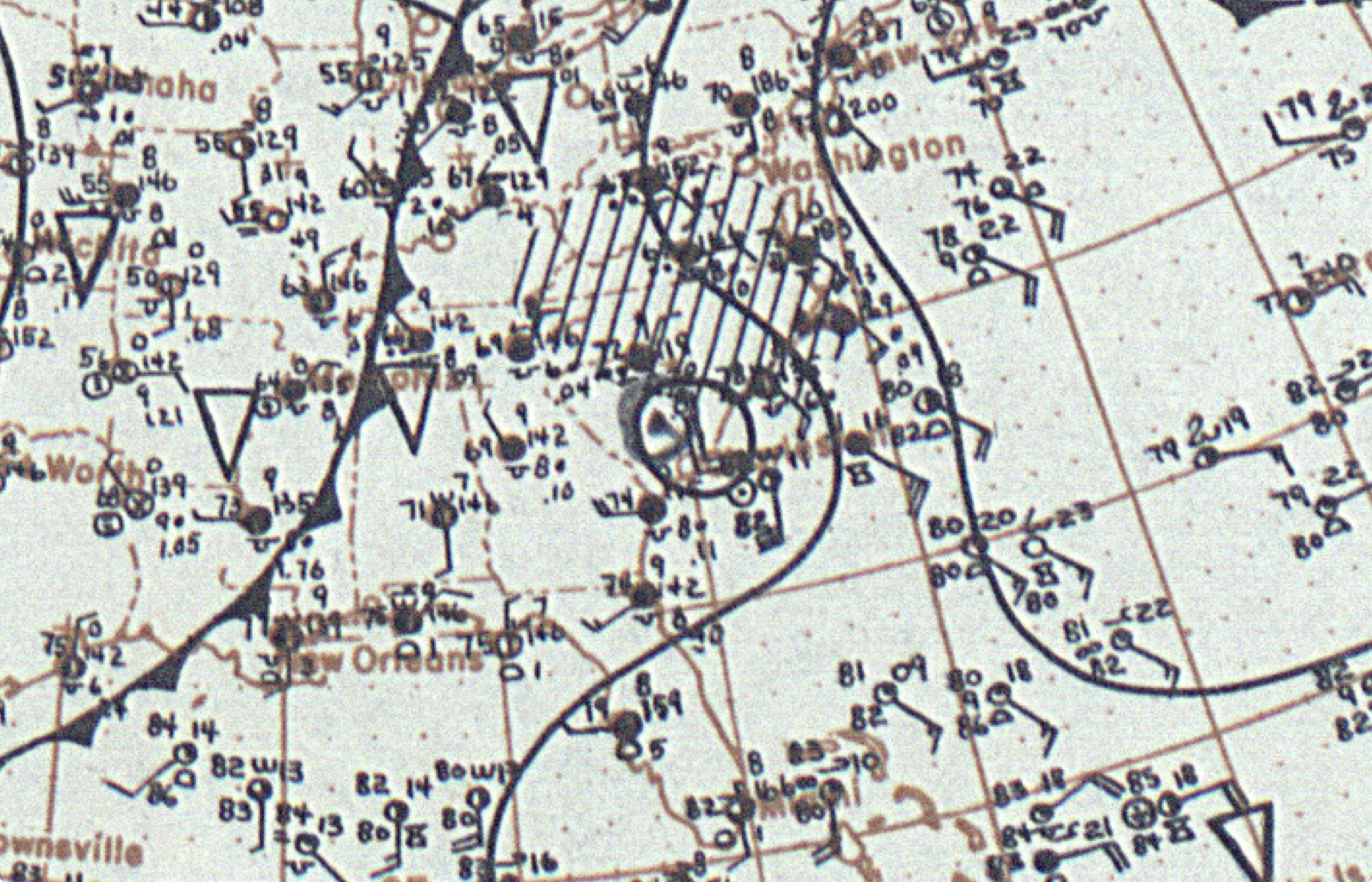
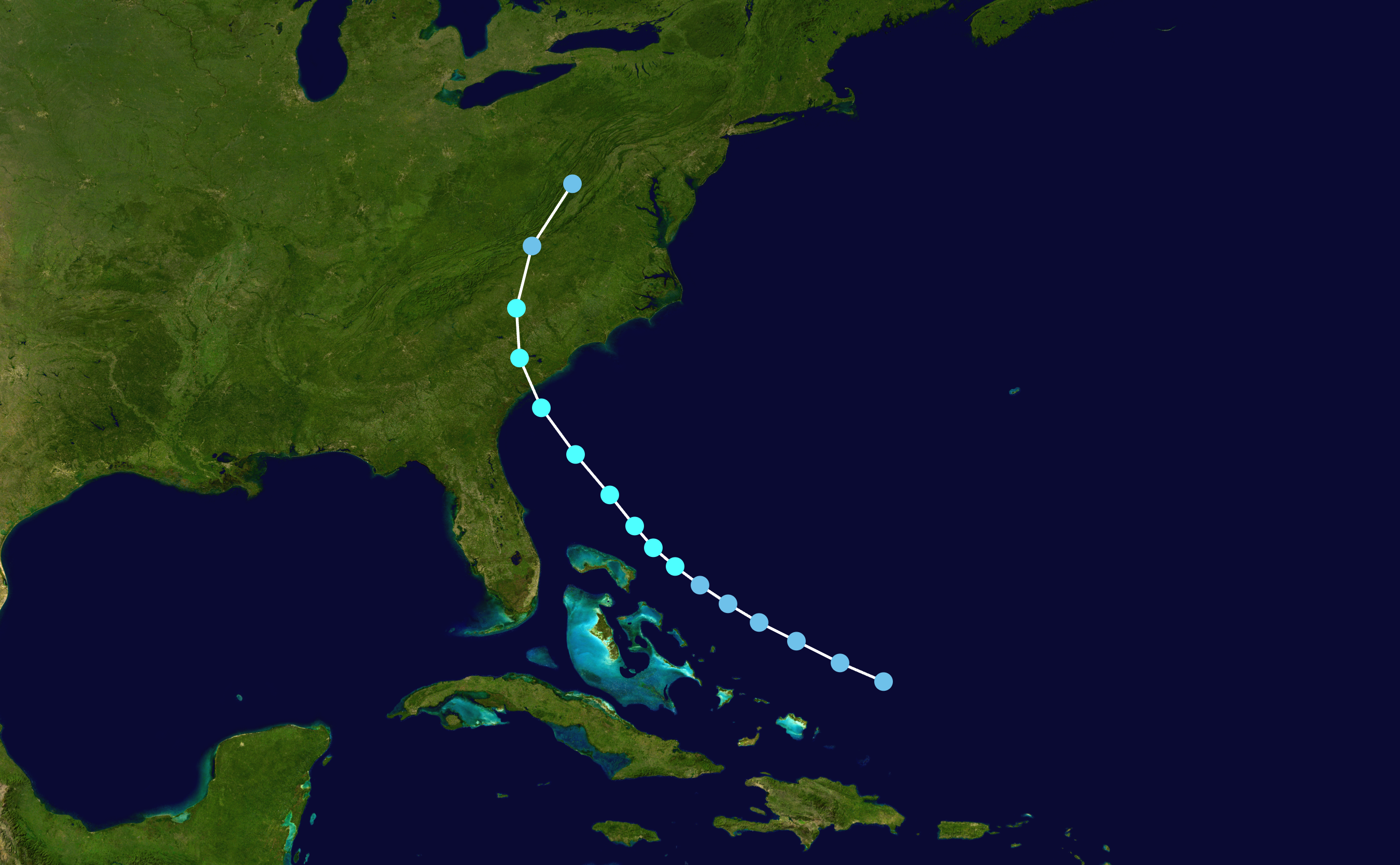
- Duration: September 30 – October 4
- Peak intensity: 60 mph (95 km/h) (1-min); 1008 mbar (hPa)

At approximately 12:00 UTC on September 30, a low pressure area developed into a tropical depression while situated about 175 mi (280 km) northeast of Turks and Caicos Islands. The depression moved parallel to the islands of the Bahamas and slowly strengthened, reaching tropical storm status early on October 2. Continuing its northwestward motion, the storm strengthened further and peaked early on October 3 with maximum sustained winds of 60 mph (95 km/h) and a minimum barometric pressure of 1,008 mbar (29.8 inHg), the latter of which was a ship observation. Around 09:00 UTC, the cyclone made landfall near Beaufort, South Carolina, at the same intensity. The storm curved northward after moving inland and weakened to a tropical depression early on October 4. Several hours later, the system dissipated over West Virginia.

In South Carolina, rainfall was generally beneficial due to ongoing drought conditions. In Beaufort, many tree branches were felled in several neighborhoods of the city. Many were left without power for several hours on morning of October 3, crippling industries that depended on electricity, including delaying publication of The Beaufort Gazette because the linotype machine could not be used. Very minor damage occurred to corn in the city. Elsewhere in the state, particularly in Charleston, there were widespread telephone, telegraph, and power outages due to downed lines and poles, severing communications. In North Carolina, similar damage occurred to the methods of communications in Raleigh, Selma, Siler City, and other areas closer to the Virginia state line due to wires knocked over by strong winds.

=== Tropical Storm Six ===
- Tropical storm (SSHWS)
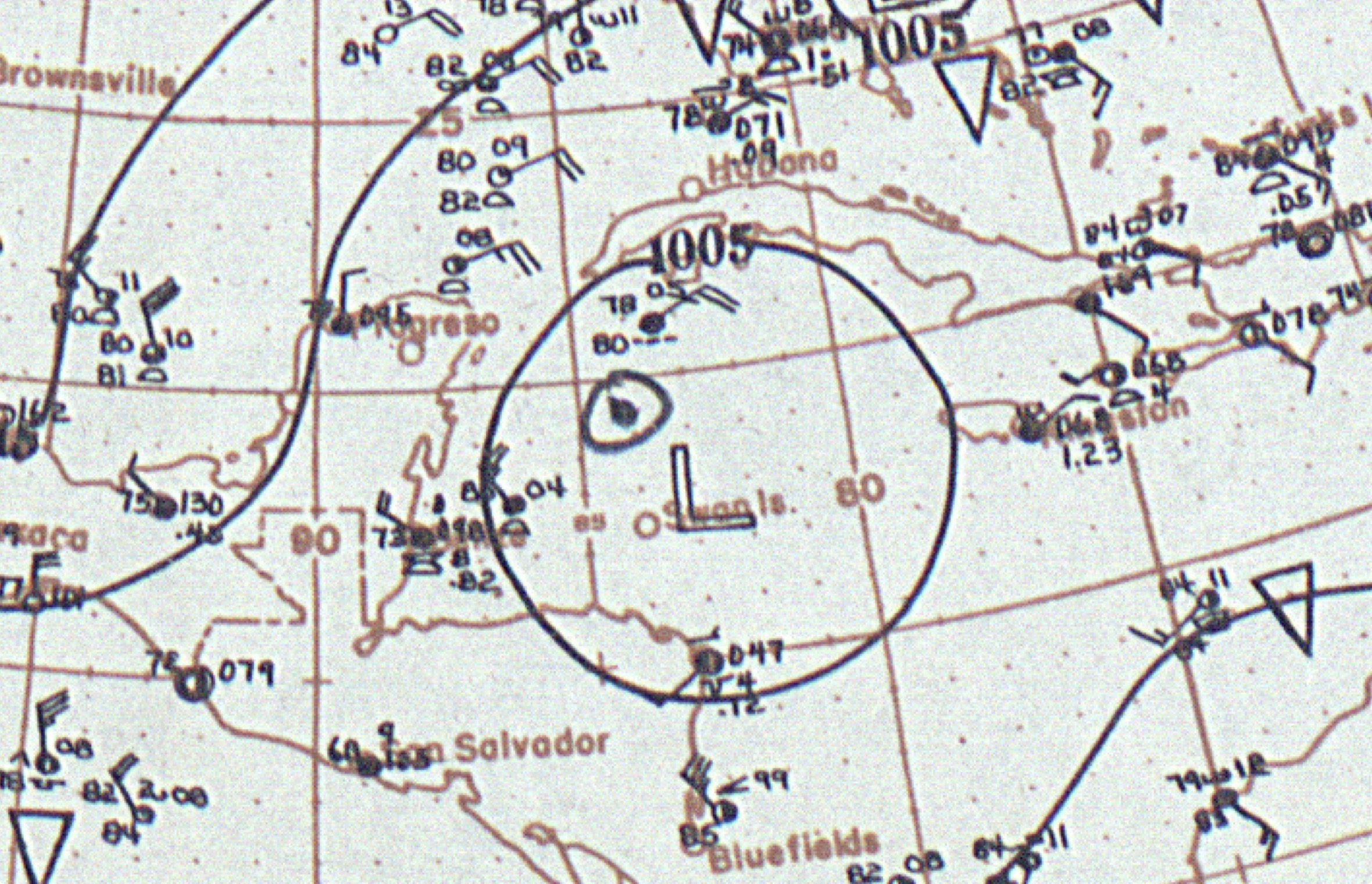
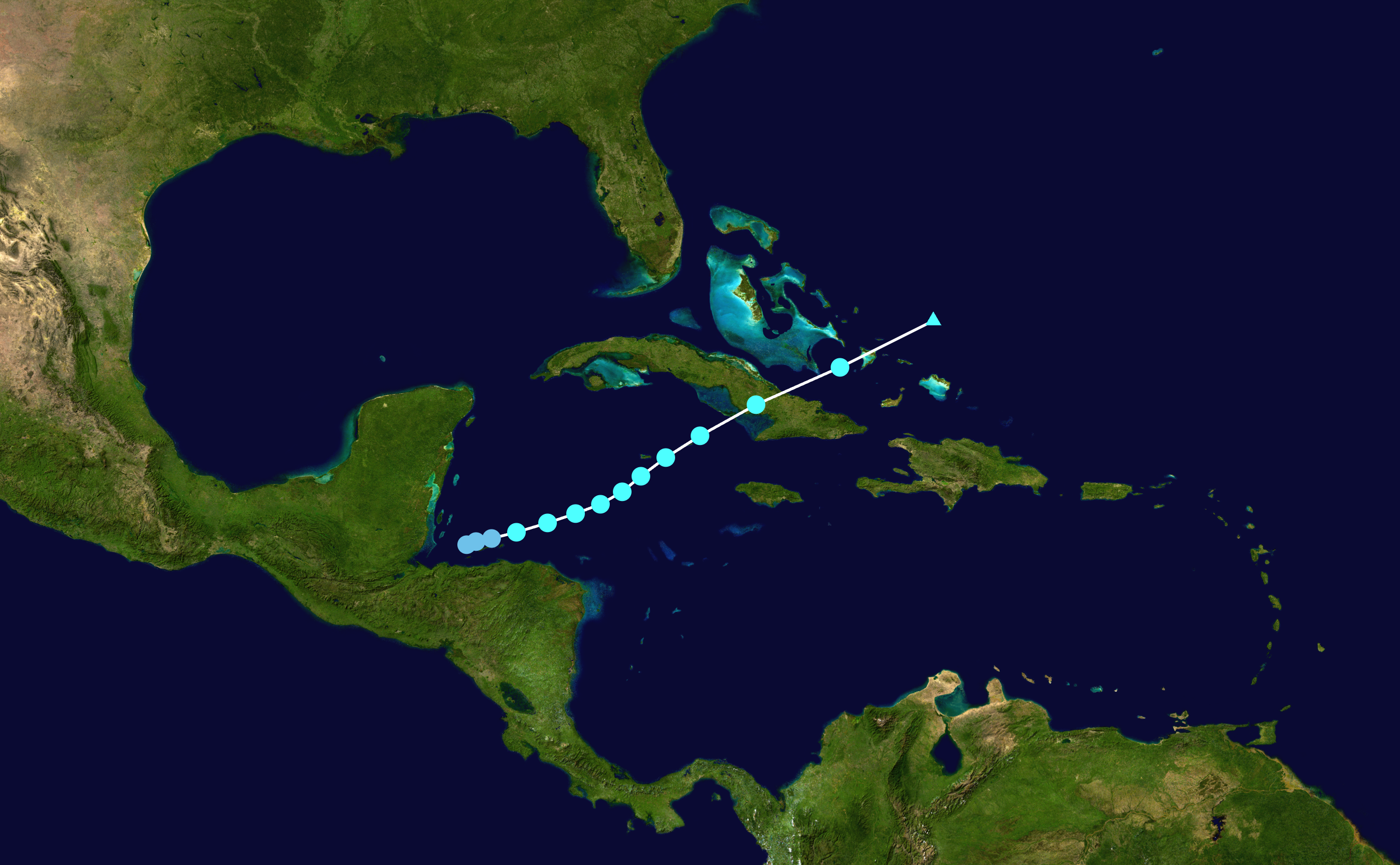
- Duration: October 16 – October 19
- Peak intensity: 45 mph (75 km/h) (1-min); 999 mbar (hPa)

The season's next cyclone developed from over the northwestern Caribbean Sea from a broad low pressure area near the Bay Islands Department of Honduras on October 16. Moving east-northeastward, the system strengthened into a tropical storm several hours later. Early on October 17, the system peaked with winds of 45 mph (75 km/h), based on a ship observation of a minimum barometric pressure of 999 mbar (29.5 inHg). Curving northeastward, it made landfall near Santa Cruz del Sur, Camagüey Province, late on October 18 at the same intensity. After crossing Cuba, the storm accelerated and moved through the Bahamas early the following day, striking the island of Acklins. By 06:00 UTC, the system was absorbed by a cold front while located about 105 mi (170 km) north-northeast of Mayaguana.

The Government of Cuba issued warnings in anticipation of the storm in the central provinces of the island, particularly over concerns of heavy rainfall. Additionally, radio messages were sent to ship to warning of the approaching cyclone. Heavy rains caused some crop damage but little else of consequence.

=== October tropical depression ===
The northern portion of the disturbance that would later develop into the previous system split and spawned a tropical depression over the northern Bahamas on October 17. The depression moved rapidly northward ahead of an approaching frontal boundary. Historical weather maps indicated that the highest sustained winds were at 30 mph (50 km/h) and the minimum barometric pressure was 1,004 mbar (29.6 inHg). The depression was absorbed by the front on the same day.

=== Tropical Storm Seven ===
- Tropical storm (SSHWS)
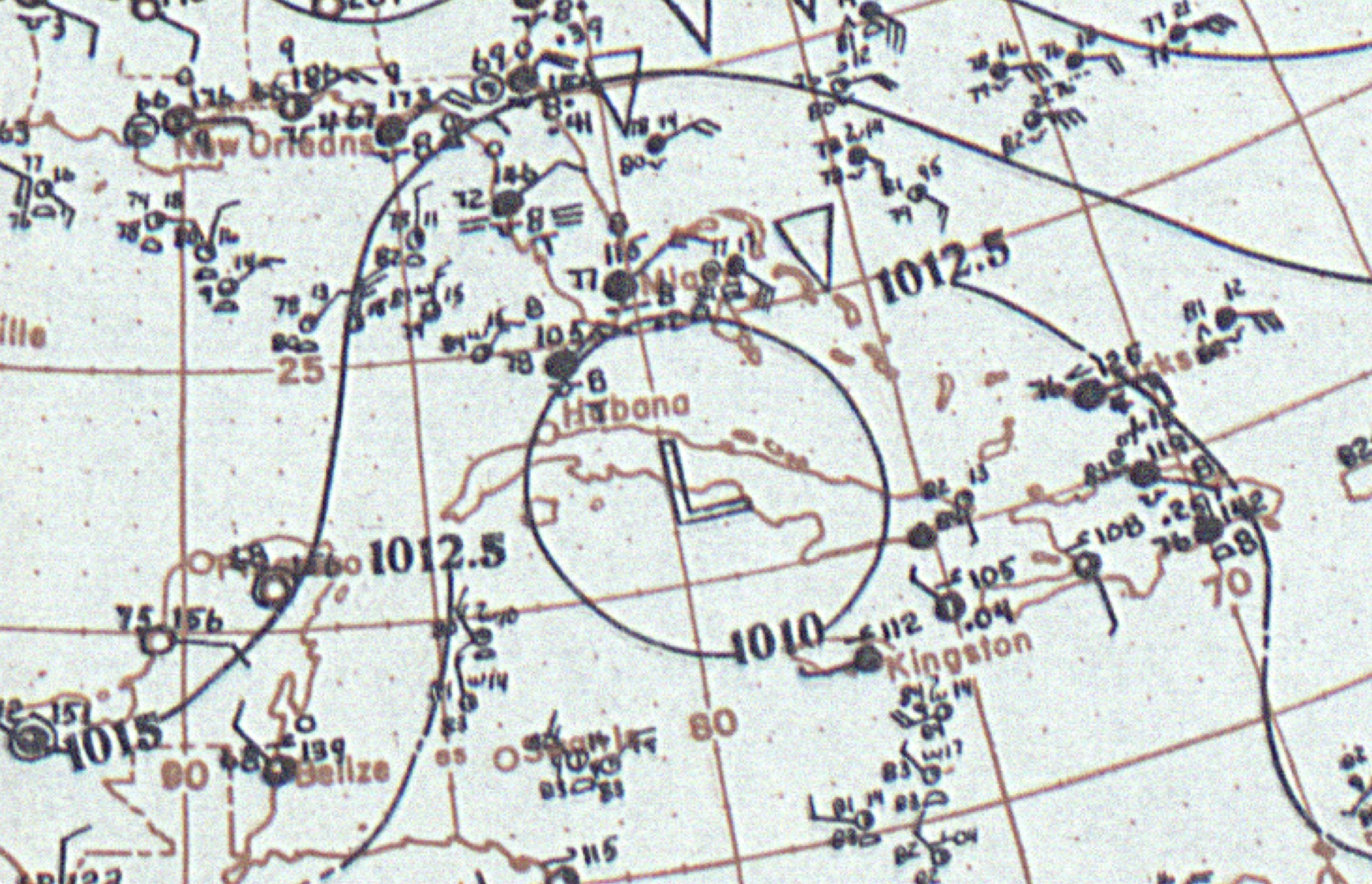
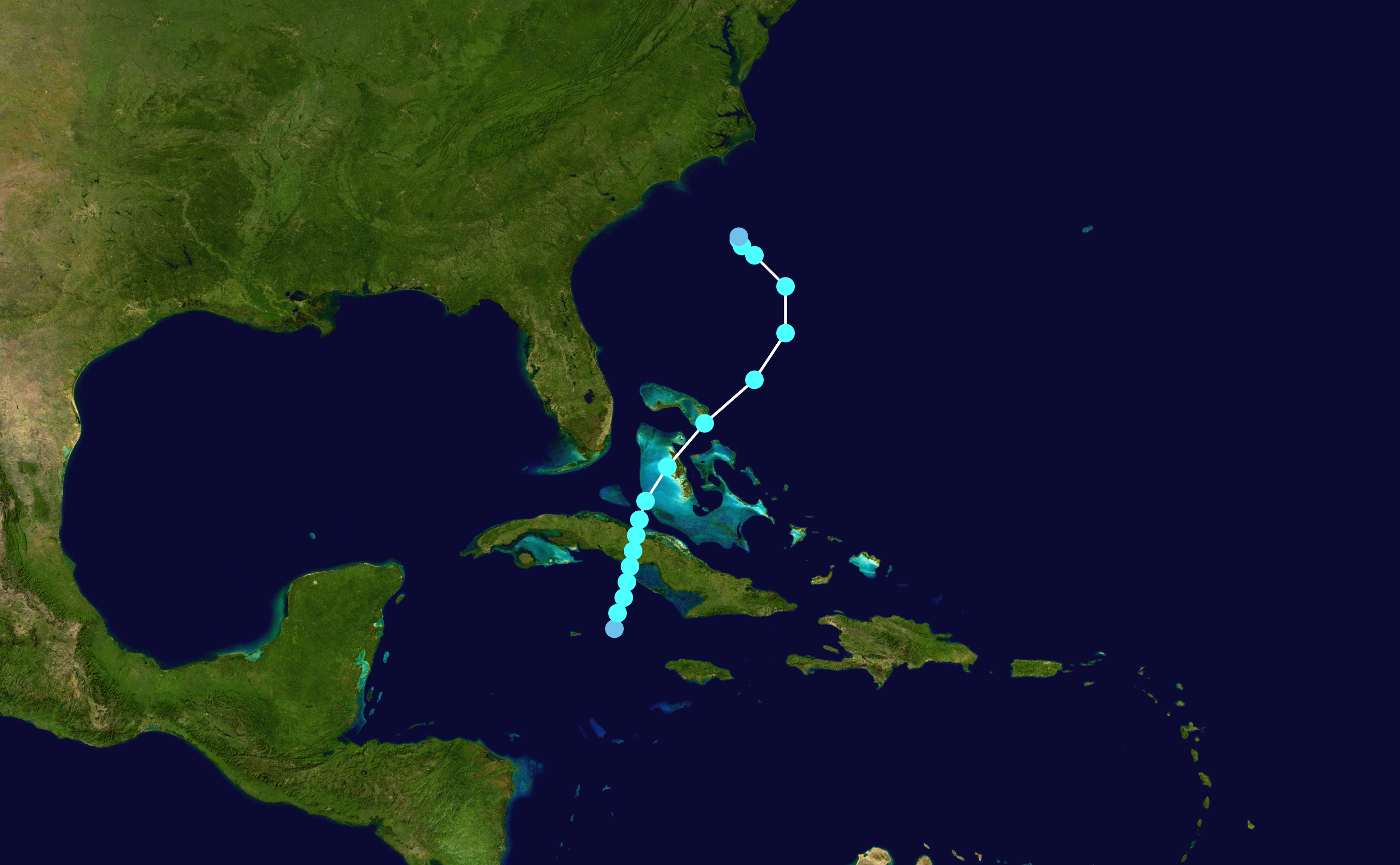
- Duration: October 30 – November 3
- Peak intensity: 45 mph (75 km/h) (1-min); 1011 mbar (hPa)

A weak low pressure area developed into the seventh storm of the season formed near the Cayman Islands on October 30. Initially a tropical depression, it tracked slowly north-northeastward and reached tropical storm status about six hours after forming. Early on October 31, the storm peaked with maximum sustained winds of 45 mph (75 km/h), several hours before making landfall in Sancti Spíritus Province several hours later. After emerging over the Bahamas, the storm slowly weakened. Late on November 1, the system struck Andros Island with winds of 40 mph (65 km/h). Thereafter, the cyclone accelerated and continued weakening, falling to tropical depression intensity late on November 3. Shortly thereafter, it transitioned into an extratropical cyclone while located about 215 mi (345 km) south of Cape Hatteras, North Carolina.

The remnants contributed to the development of the system which brought devastating floods to the Northeastern United States. Following well above average precipitation in October, this system brought as much as 15 in (380 mm) to Vermont, contributing to the Great Vermont Flood of 1927. The flooding left at least $50 million (1927 USD) in damage and 85 deaths, with all but one death occurring in Vermont.

=== Tropical Storm Eight ===
- Tropical storm (SSHWS)
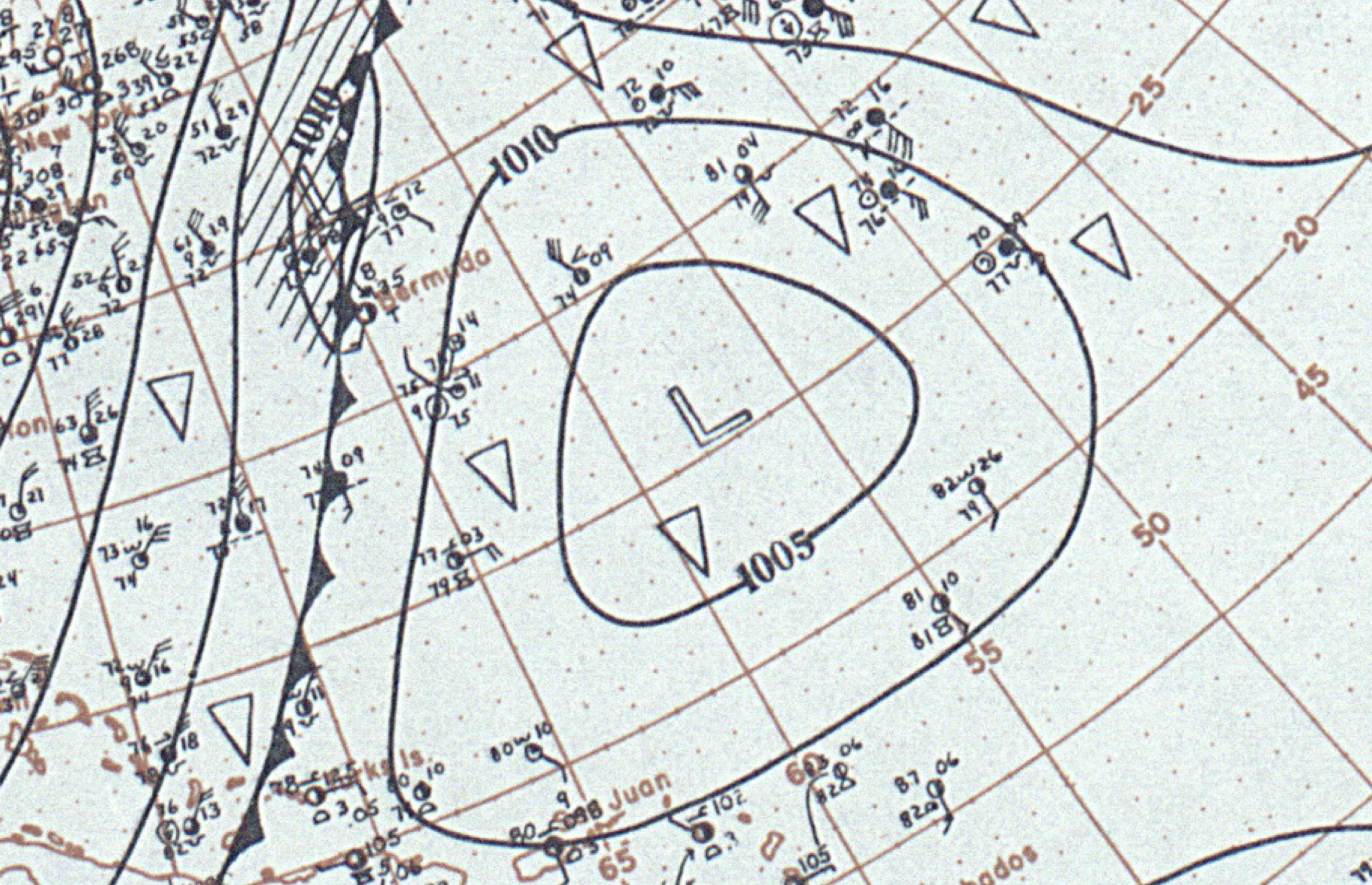
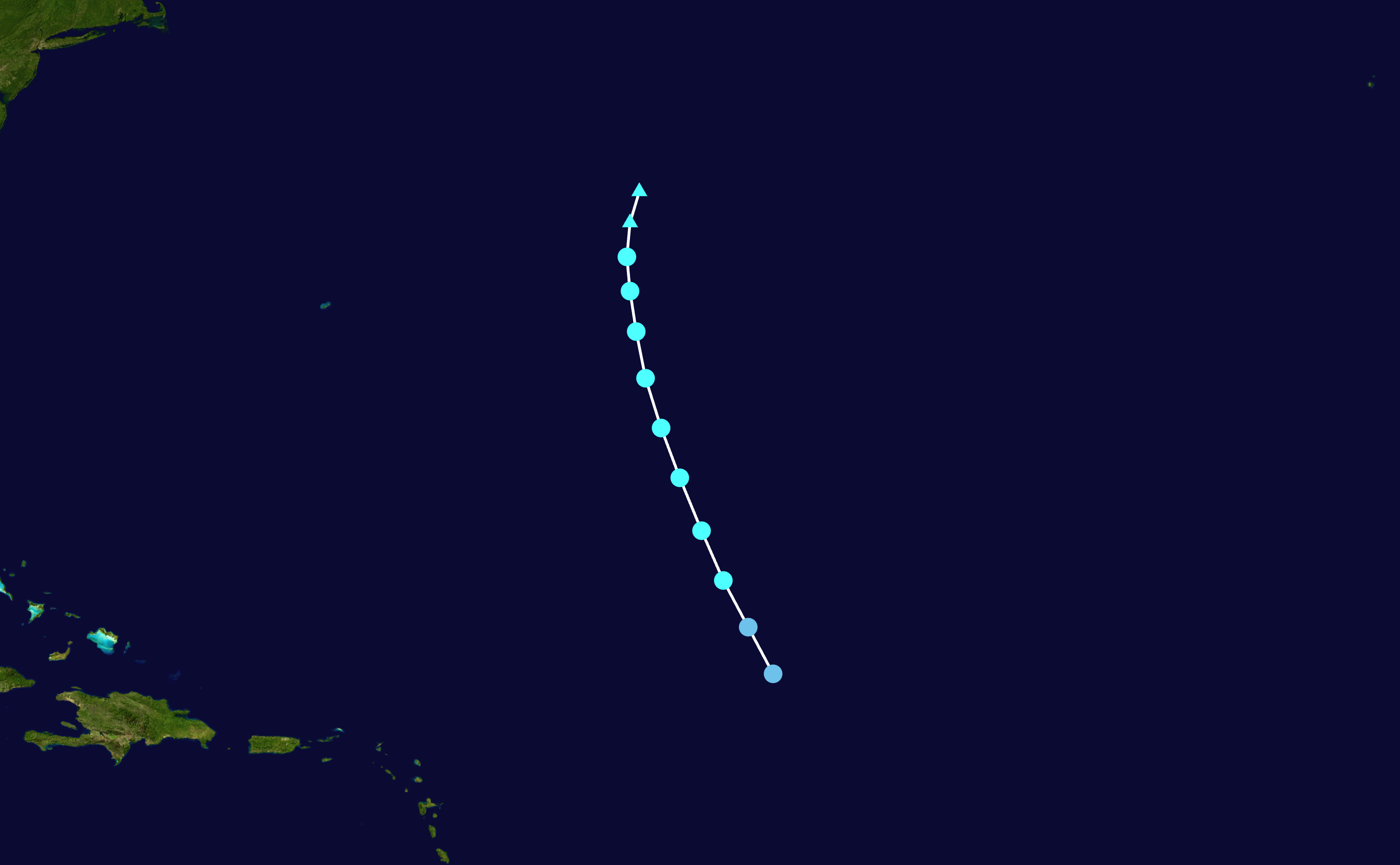
- Duration: November 19 – November 21
- Peak intensity: 60 mph (95 km/h) (1-min); 999 mbar (hPa)

The final tropical cyclone of the season developed from a low pressure area early on November 19, while situated about 770 mi (1,240 km) east-northeast of Barbuda. Initially a tropical depression, the cyclone deepened into a tropical storm about 12 hours later while moving north-northwestward. At 12:00 UTC on November 20, a ship observed a barometric pressure of 999 mbar (29.5 inHg), the lowest known pressure in association with the storm. Using the pressure-wind relationship, it is estimated that the storm reached maximum sustained winds of 60 mph (95 km/h) at that time. On November 21, the storm weakened and lost tropical characteristics, merging with a cold front about 585 mi (940 km) east-northeast of Bermuda at 12:00 UTC. The extratropical cyclone persisted for only about six more hours. This storm may have been subtropical, but in the absence of satellite imagery, it is considered a tropical cyclone.

== See also ==
- 1927 Pacific typhoon season
- 1900–1940 South Pacific cyclone seasons
- 1900–1950 South-West Indian Ocean cyclone seasons
- 1920s Australian region cyclone seasons
