= List of hurricanes in Canada =

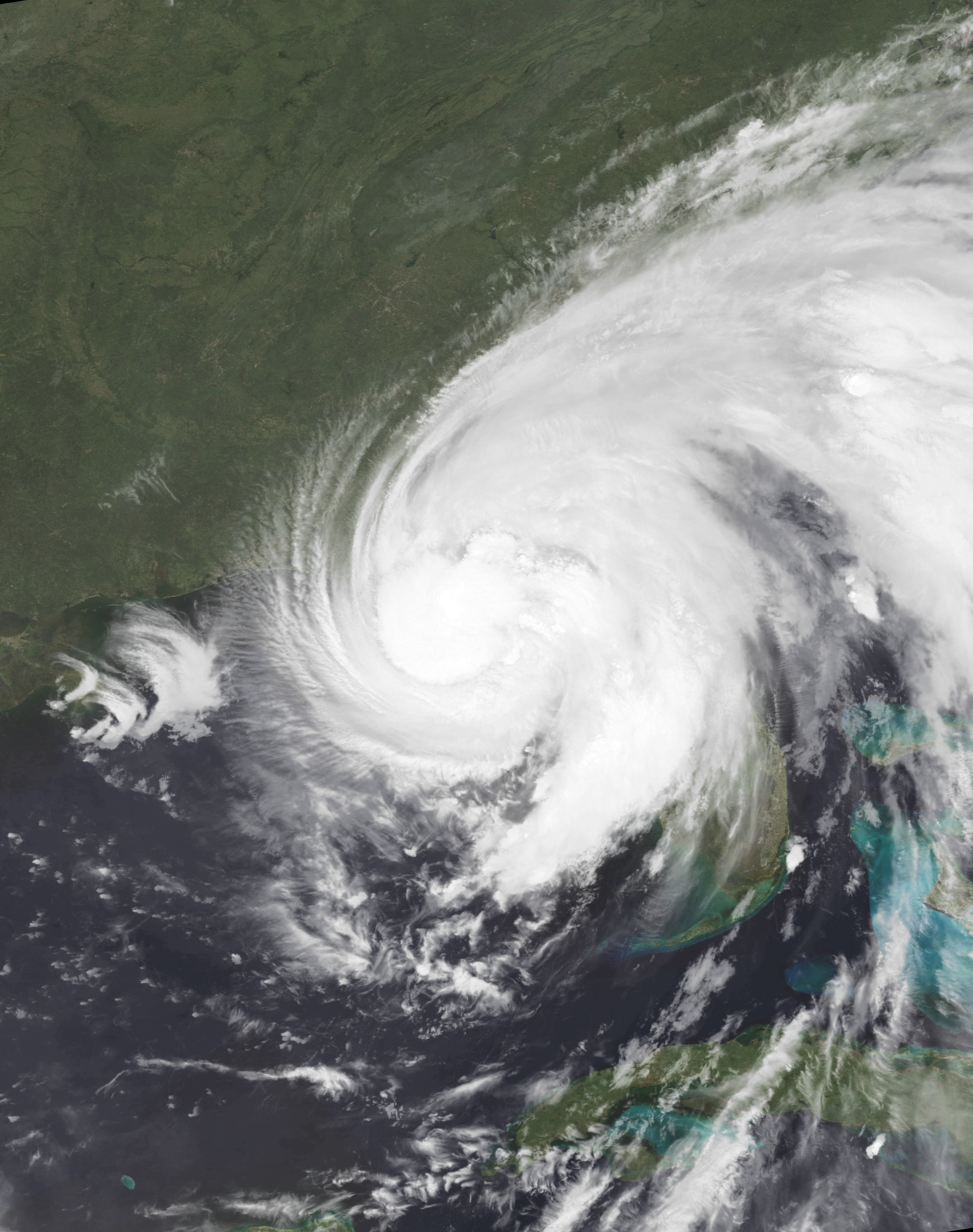
Hurricane Debby was one of the costliest weather events in Quebec's history

The list of hurricanes in Canada refers to any tropical cyclone originating in the Atlantic or Pacific Ocean affecting the country of Canada.

== Overview ==
Atlantic Canada has been hit with many storms, with the ones that do hit usually being weak storms, due to the generally cool waters offshore. Some hurricanes can strike the area full force as the warm Gulf Stream extends fairly close to Atlantic Canada. Due to the cool waters for a great distance from the Pacific coast of Canada, there has never been a storm of any intensity to affect the Pacific coast. On occasions, tropical systems can transition into or be absorbed by non-tropical systems that strongly affect Western Canada, most notably by the remnants of Typhoon Freda that were absorbed by the Columbus Day Storm of 1962.

The Canadian Hurricane Centre (CHC) states Hurricane Ella of 1978 is the strongest tropical cyclone in Canadian waters, passing approximately 335 miles (539 km) south of Halifax, Nova Scotia as a Category 4 hurricane. Ella did not make landfall. The strongest hurricane to make landfall in Canada was Hurricane Ginny of 1963, which had winds of 105 mph (169 km/h) and a minimum pressure of 948 millibars (28.0 inHg), making it a Category 2 hurricane at the time of its landfall near Yarmouth, Nova Scotia.

Sometimes, a hurricane will make landfall in the United States and continue northward to dissipate over (or partially over) Canada. Only a handful of storms that have taken this path have been devastating in Canada. Two examples of this happening include the 1900 Galveston hurricane and Hurricane Hazel in 1954. Hurricanes that entered Canada from the U.S. after landfall are omitted from the lists, with being devastating, or notable cyclones. Many extratropical remnants of tropical cyclones have entered Canada. They are not included in the list unless they were particularly notable. This article also includes hurricanes that affected Newfoundland prior to its entry into Canada in 1949, and hurricanes that affected any Canadian provinces before confederation in 1867.

== List of tropical cyclones ==
=== Pre-1900 ===
Many tropical storms and hurricanes struck present-day Canada during this time. The most damaging one struck Newfoundland in September 1775, killing thousands. To shorten this particular list, insignificant tropical storms and depressions are omitted.

- September 9, 1775: The 1775 Newfoundland hurricane killed over 4,000 in Newfoundland. Not only is it the earliest recorded Canadian hurricane, it is also by far the deadliest.
- October 10–11, 1804: The 1804 New England hurricane unusually blanketed parts of Canada with snow after striking New England.
- August 23, 1863: A Category 1 hurricane hit Nova Scotia just before losing tropical characteristics.
- September 23–24, 1866: A hurricane hit Newfoundland after weakening from a Category 2 hurricane.
- October 5, 1869: The 1869 Saxby Gale struck Canada's Bay of Fundy region damaging parts of New Brunswick and Nova Scotia, killing 37 people offshore.
- October 13, 1871: A hurricane hit Nova Scotia.
- August 26, 1873: The Nova Scotia Hurricane of 1873 drifted south of Nova Scotia as a Category 3 hurricane. It weakened to a Category 1 before slowly making landfall in Newfoundland. It was a devastating hurricane that killed over 600. Damage in Nova Scotia was severe. It destroyed over 1,200 boats and over 900 homes and businesses. This is one of Nova Scotia's worst cyclones.
- October 1882: Remnants of a hurricane hit Labrador, resulting in 140 deaths.
- August 26, 1883: A Category 1 hurricane passed offshore Newfoundland, resulting in 80 deaths.
- August 23, 1886: A major hurricane weakened to a Category 1 hurricane before crossing Newfoundland as a hurricane.
- September 8, 1891: A hurricane struck both Nova Scotia and Newfoundland as a Category 1 hurricane.
- August 18, 1893: A hurricane struck Newfoundland with 90 mph (140 km/h) winds.

=== 1900–1949 ===
- September 12–14, 1900: After leaving behind a trail of devastation in the United States, the 1900 Galveston hurricane affected six Canadian provinces as a powerful extratropical cyclone, killing 52–232 people, mainly due to shipwrecks.
- August 8, 1926: The 1926 Nova Scotia hurricane made landfall in Nova Scotia as an extratropical storm, killing 55–58 people.
- August 24, 1927: The 1927 Nova Scotia hurricane made landfall in Nova Scotia as a Category 2 hurricane with 105 mph (169 km/h) winds, causing immense damage, reaching $1.6 million (1927 USD), and killed 172–193 people.
- August 26, 1935: A Category 1 hurricane struck Newfoundland as an extratropical storm, resulting in major damage and at least 50 offshore deaths.
- September 26, 1937: The extratropical remnant of a hurricane caused damage in Nova Scotia. The storm was moving swiftly, so most of the damage was strictly wind related.
- September 21, 1938: The 1938 New England hurricane tracked into Canada, bringing strong winds to eastern Ontario and southern Quebec. Damage was primarily limited to trees and power lines; structural damage was minimal. This storm, along with Hurricane Hazel in 1954, was one of the few hurricanes to cause hurricane-force winds in Canada's interior.
- October 18, 1939: A Category 2 hurricane became extratropical before striking the island as a Category 1 hurricane. No one died, but considerable damage was done to trees, boats, and buildings.
- September 17, 1940: The 1940 Nova Scotia hurricane struck Nova Scotia as a Category 1 hurricane before weakening.

=== 1950–1999 ===
- August 21, 1950: Hurricane Able struck Nova Scotia as a strong tropical storm, causing only minor damage.
- October 5, 1950: Hurricane George passed a few miles south as a tropical/extratropical storm.
- February 5, 1952: The 1952 Groundhog Day tropical storm, affected New Brunswick before dissipating.
- September 7, 1953: Hurricane Carol struck the New Brunswick/Nova Scotia border. It caused about $1 million in damage, mainly to boats and fish craft.
- October 16, 1954: Hurricane Hazel moved into Ontario as a powerful extratropical storm (still of hurricane intensity) after having struck the Carolinas. Flash flooding from Hazel in Canada destroyed twenty bridges, killed 81 people, and left over 2,000 families homeless. In all, Hazel killed nearly 100 people and caused almost $630 million (2005 CAD) in damages (on top of over 500 other deaths and billions in damage in the US and Caribbean). No other recent natural disaster on Canadian soil has been so deadly. Floods killed 35 people on a single street in Toronto.
- August 23, 1955: Hurricane Connie – When Connie entered Ontario as a tropical storm, it continued to produce winds of up to 46 mph (74 km/h), and the storm dropped 2.56 inches (65 mm) of rainfall near the Great Lakes. In Burlington, 27 boats were destroyed, and one person drowned in Lake Erie after his boat sank. Two other people drowned in the province. Connie destroyed six houses and damaged several others due to high waves.
- September 29, 1958: Hurricane Helene became extratropical before striking Nova Scotia and Newfoundland as a Category 1 hurricane. Although not very damaging in Canada, Helene did destroy a 50-metre (160-foot) wharf carrying many lobster traps out to sea.
- June 19, 1959: The 1959 Escuminac Hurricane was a devastating extratropical storm that hit Nova Scotia at hurricane strength. Killing 35 people, the storm was so devastating that a monument was erected on Escuminac Harbour in memory of those lost.
- July 12, 1959: Tropical Storm Cindy struck north of Nova Scotia as an extratropical cyclone.
- October 10, 1961: After reaching Category 4 intensity near Bermuda, Hurricane Frances became extratropical as it approached the Gulf of Maine. The remnants then curved east-northeastward and struck Nova Scotia, before dissipating early on October 10.
- October 8, 1962: Hurricane Daisy struck Nova Scotia as a Category 1-equivalent extratropical cyclone, near the same area as Frances a year earlier, which also struck the area while extratropical.
- October 12, 1962: Typhoon Freda struck British Columbia as a very powerful extratropical cyclone with pressure equivalent to a major hurricane.
- October 29, 1963: Hurricane Ginny struck Nova Scotia as a strong Category 2 hurricane, the strongest to ever make landfall in Canada. Ginny was unusual in the fact that the hurricane produced snow.
- October 24, 1964: Hurricane Gladys dissipated near the coast of Newfoundland just after making landfall.
- August 16, 1971: Hurricane Beth struck Nova Scotia as a minimal hurricane, bringing over 11 inches (280 mm) of rainfall.
- July 7, 1973: Hurricane Alice side-swiped the entire western coast of Newfoundland as a tropical storm before dissipating over Newfoundland.
- July 28, 1975: Hurricane Blanche struck Nova Scotia as a tropical storm, dropping over 3 inches (76 mm) of rainfall.
- October 25, 1979: A subtropical storm struck Newfoundland as a subtropical storm after losing hurricane strength.
- August 7–8, 1988: Tropical Storm Alberto, the furthest north forming tropical storm ever recorded in the Atlantic, struck the Canadian Maritimes and became extratropical over Newfoundland. Alberto was the first storm with a masculine name to directly strike Canada.
- August 8, 1989: Hurricane Dean passed over Newfoundland before losing tropical characteristics.
- August 2, 1990: Hurricane Bertha's extratropical remnants damaged crops and a suspension bridge in Prince Edward Island.
- November 2, 1991: The 1991 unnamed hurricane, although staying mostly out to sea, made landfall in Nova Scotia as a tropical storm. The storm was not very damaging in Canada, but caused horrendous damage elsewhere.
- July 9, 1995: Tropical Storm Barry hit Nova Scotia while tropical with no known damage.
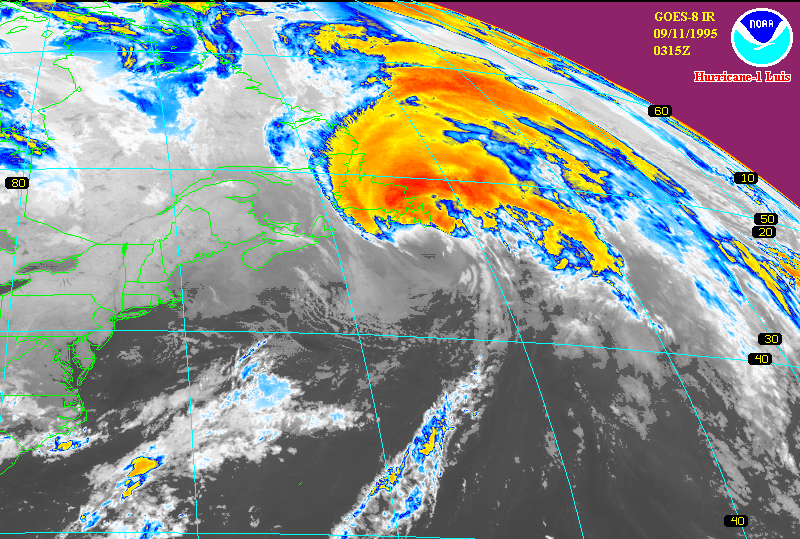
  Luis making landfall in Canada
- September 11, 1995: Hurricane Luis, after raging through the Leeward Islands, turned towards Newfoundland on September 8. The CHC issued bulletins on the powerful hurricane as it neared the province. Luis struck a sparsely populated area in eastern Newfoundland on September 11, dropping 2 to 4 inches (51 to 102 millimetres) of rain in the Avalon Peninsula without causing much damage. One was reported killed in Canada from Luis.
- July 14, 1996: Hurricane Bertha struck Newfoundland before dissipating, but passed from Maine to New Brunswick earlier in its life, dropping over 3 inches (76 mm) of rain in New Brunswick.
- September 13–15, 1996: An unusual storm over the Great Lakes, which may have briefly been a tropical or subtropical cyclone, dropped over 4 inches (100 mm) of rain over parts of Ontario.
- September 15, 1996: Hurricane Hortense, the first hurricane to directly strike Nova Scotia while at hurricane strength since Blanche in 1975, struck the Nova Scotian coast as a Category 1 hurricane. $3 million were inflicted to Nova Scotia by Hortense after strong winds, heavy rain, and power outages.
- September 18, 1999: Hurricane Floyd struck the Canadian Maritimes after losing tropical characteristics. Despite high interest in Floyd by the CHC, little damage was inflicted in Canada. Floyd did, however, bring winds of 51 mph (82 km/h) and high seas.

=== 2000–present ===
- October 20, 2000: Hurricane Michael struck Harbour Breton as a Category 1 hurricane. A peak gust was recorded of nearly 107 mph (172 km/h), as well as a peak wave height of over 55 feet (17 m) that was recorded off the coast by Buoy 44193. Overall damage by Michael was light.
- October 15, 2001: Hurricane Karen brought beneficial rain after striking Liverpool, Nova Scotia. Winds there only gusted to about 64 mph (103 km/h), and little damage was reported.
- September 12, 2002: Hurricane Gustav struck Nova Scotia and Newfoundland, both as a Category 1 hurricane. Gustav brought hurricane-force winds to Nova Scotia and dropped at least two inches (51 mm) of rain across all Nova Scotian sites. The highest rainfall amount was 4 inches (100 mm) in Ashdale.
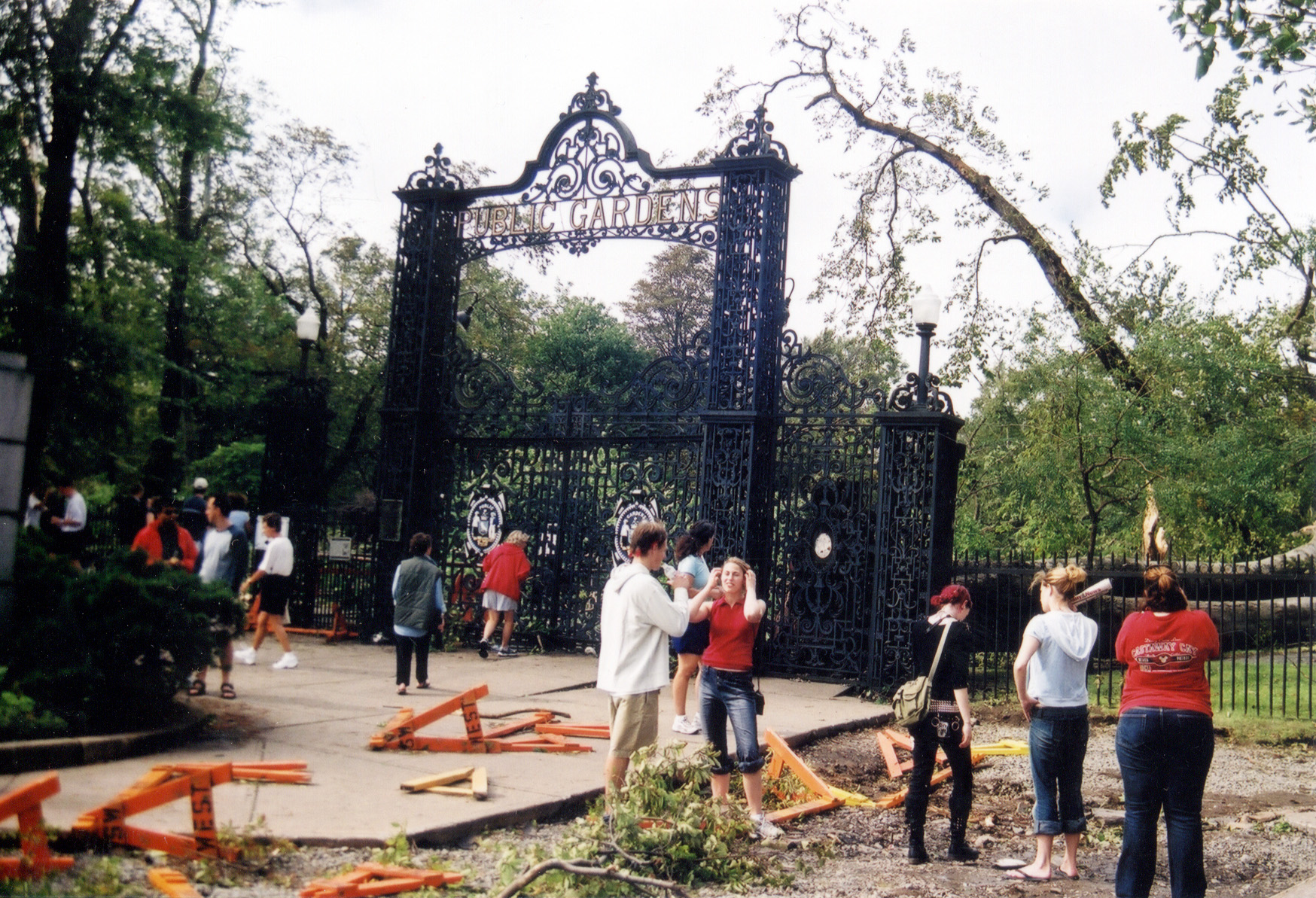
  Damage left by Juan.
- September 29, 2003: Hurricane Juan was at the time Atlantic Canada's most destructive hurricane in over a century. Juan killed 8 and caused over $200 million in damage. Power outages in Nova Scotia and Prince Edward Island left over 300,000 Canadians without power for two weeks. Many marinas were destroyed and many small fish craft were damaged or sank. Hurricane-force gusts were reported as far out as 100 miles (160 km) on either side of Juan at landfall with an astounding peak gust of 144 mph (232 km/h) (equivalent to a Category 4 hurricane) recorded in Halifax Harbour, although it was a Category 2 at landfall with 100 mph (160 km/h) sustained winds.
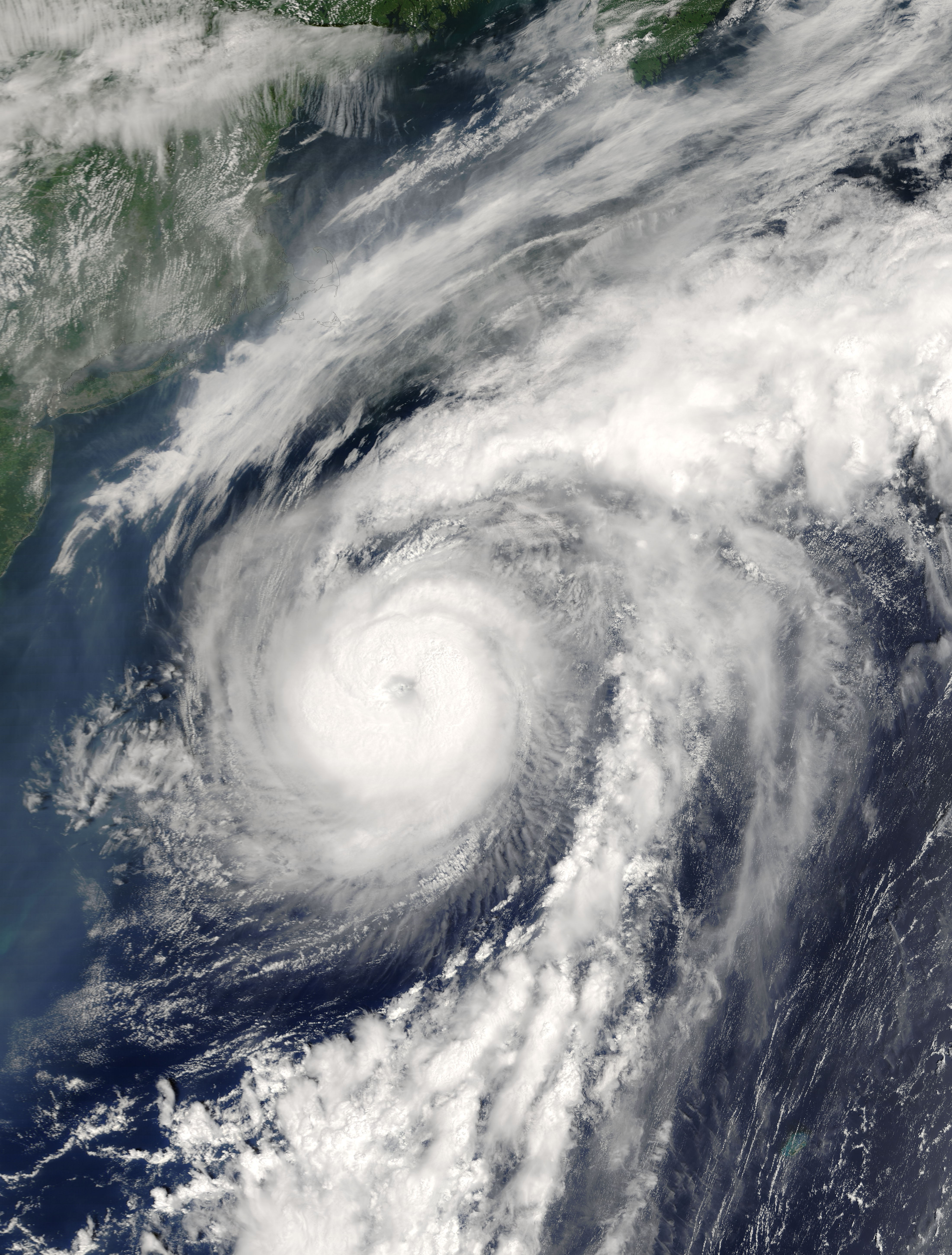
  Hurricane Alex, one of very few major hurricanes to remain at this strength just south of Nova Scotia.
- September 17, 2005: Hurricane Ophelia, after stalling for several days off the coast of the southeastern states, raced up the Atlantic coast. On the 17th, Ophelia became extratropical and moved parallel to the Nova Scotian coast, never making landfall. Ophelia later struck Newfoundland. Although strong winds were forecast, they did not occur and overall damage was less than expected. One indirect death was reported from Ophelia in Canada.
- November 3, 2006: the 2006 Central Pacific cyclone, after developing in the north-central Pacific, the system weakened and made landfall on the Olympic Peninsula of Washington State, though it did bring heavy rainfall to Vancouver Island. The exact nature of this storm is debatable, but it appears to have been a tropical or subtropical cyclone for at least a portion of its life. Nonetheless, this cyclone is not included in any archives of the National Hurricane Center, though it was classified as extra-tropical by the Canadian Hurricane Centre.
- November 6–7, 2007: Hurricane Noel, after gaining hurricane-force winds north of the Bahama Islands, moved north toward the Cape Cod region of the Massachusetts U.S. coast. After swiping southeast Massachusetts with hurricane-force winds, the system transitioned to an extratropical stage at which time the storm slightly intensified and moved north-northeast to the Nova Scotia coast near Yarmouth. Full hurricane-force conditions occurred over much of southeastern and eastern areas of Nova Scotia from Yarmouth north and eastward to the metropolitan Halifax area(84 mph recorded at McNabs/Halifax). This very same area reported large-scale power and utility line damage as well as widespread tree damage. In areas south of Halifax the tree damage was more severe than that which had occurred during Hurricane Juan in 2003. This was due to the longer transition over the southern peninsula of Nova Scotia than that of Juan. Though at Category 1 status, Noel in its extratropical stage was responsible for coastal damage to some structures from waves and tides and wind damage to roofing and windows. Western areas of Nova Scotia, even well inland received strong gales, the strongest of which occurred in relation to a tropical system since hurricanes Gerda of 1969 and Ginny of 1963.
- September 28, 2008: Hurricane Kyle, after forming as a tropical storm just east of the Bahamas, headed north, making landfall in Nova Scotia as a Category 1 hurricane, causing power outages to 40,000 and $9 million in damage.
- August 23, 2009: Hurricane Bill, a Cape Verde hurricane, brushed by Cape Breton Island, Nova Scotia causing up to 2.3 in of rain. 32,000 residences were reported to have lost power in addition to winds recorded up to 50 mph. Bill then made landfall at Point Rosie, on the Burin Peninsula of Newfoundland.
- September 3, 2010: Hurricane Earl made landfall at Western Head, Nova Scotia as a minimal hurricane. Earl produced 80–120 km/h (50–75 mph) sustained winds throughout Nova Scotia, which resulted in widespread power outages, fallen trees, and minor coastal flooding. After crossing Nova Scotia, Earl sped across Prince Edward Island before emerging into the Gulf of Saint Lawrence. As the storm tracked through the Gulf of Saint Lawrence, western and northern Newfoundland experienced sustained tropical storm conditions. Earl finally transitioned into a non-tropical low approximately 120 kilometres (75 mi) northeast of Anticosti Island.
- September 21, 2010: Hurricane Igor struck Cape Race, Newfoundland as a large Category 1 hurricane, resulting in major flooding and widespread power outages. Many communities were forced to declare a state of emergency, and some evacuated completely as the storm approached. Igor was unusual in that it restrengthened somewhat during its final approach despite being over cool water. As the storm made landfall near Cape Race, maximum sustained winds were estimated to be at least 120 km/h (75 mph), but gusts up to 170 km/h (110 mph) were reported. Hurricane Igor produced hurricane conditions throughout the Avalon Peninsula and tropical storm conditions over the remainder of the island. Media outlets have stated that Igor was the worst hurricane to hit Newfoundland in a century. Impacts to Newfoundland were estimated to be US$200 million
- August 28, 2011: Hurricane Irene crossed into Canada as an extratropical storm bringing heavy rain and strong winds to parts of Quebec and New Brunswick. Parts of New Brunswick received over 80mm of rain and wind gusts peaked at 93 km/h in Moncton.
- September 16, 2011: Hurricane Maria made landfall near the Avalon Peninsula of Newfoundland. Due to Maria's rapid forward speed (90+ km/h), rainfall totals were kept to a minimum and strong winds remained offshore, confined to the eastern semi-circle. As a result, little damage occurred.
- September 26, 2011: Typhoon Roke's remnants brought rain to British Columbia.
- October 3, 2011: Hurricane Ophelia made landfall near the Avalon Peninsula of Newfoundland as a strong extratropical cyclone, damaging drainage infrastructure that had been repaired after Hurricane Igor a year earlier.
- September 11, 2012: Hurricane Leslie made landfall on the Burin Peninsula of Newfoundland as a hurricane-strength post-tropical cyclone. Leslie's track put the Avalon Peninsula in the right-front quadrant, resulting in hurricane-force winds, widespread power outages, and structural damage.
- October 29–30, 2012: Hurricane Sandy crossed into Canada on October 29 through to early October 30, bringing heavy rain, high winds, and in some places, snow, to Ontario, Quebec and the Maritimes.
- July 5, 2014: Hurricane Arthur made landfall in south western Nova Scotia on July 5, 2014. The storm at the time was downgraded to a tropical storm. Arthur brought heavy rain, winds and pounding surf to parts of the Atlantic Coast of Nova Scotia. The strong storm dropped nearly 150 mm of rain to parts to New Brunswick. It cut power to 1/3 of the Nova Scotia households and 65% of New Brunswick.
- October 10, 2016: Hurricane Matthew's remnants affected Nova Scotia and Newfoundland causing heavy rain and strong winds in Nova Scotia, rain amounts were recorded from east to west as 8.85 inches (225 mm) in Sydney (Cape Breton Island), 5.09 inches (129 mm) in Port Hawkesbury. More than 100,000+ Nova Scotia Power customers lost power. Insurance loss from Matthew exceeded C$100 million (US$74 million).
- September 7–8, 2019: The post-tropical system that was once Hurricane Dorian made landfall in Nova Scotia and Prince Edward Island with hurricane-force winds and Newfoundland with tropical storm-force winds. Insurance loss across Canada exceeded C$105 million (US$78.9 million).

Satellite loop of ex-Hurricane Fiona making landfall in Nova Scotia on September 24, 2022

- July 11, 2020: Tropical Storm Fay hit Canada as a tropical cyclone with 40 mph (64 km/h) winds. It was over Quebec for 3 hours before dissipating.
- August 5-6, 2020: Hurricane Isaias became an extratropical low as it crossed into southeastern Quebec from Vermont, causing minimal effects in the province.
- September 22–23, 2020: Hurricane Teddy made landfall on Nova Scotia and Newfoundland as a quickly weakening post-tropical storm and triggered minor flooding to the region. Damage was valued at C$20 million (US$15 million).
- September 10–11, 2021: Hurricane Larry struck South East Bight, Newfoundland as a Category 1 hurricane.
- September 10–12, 2022: Hurricane Earl impacted Newfoundland with its outer bands, causing flooding and damages. However, no fatalities were reported in the area.
- September 24–25, 2022: Hurricane Fiona made landfall in Whitehead, Nova Scotia as a post-tropical cyclone with Category 2 force winds of 170 km/h. Fiona is the strongest storm to ever impact Canada as measured by barometric pressure. Hart Island, NS recorded a pressure reading of 931.6 millibars, which shattered the previous record of 940.2 millibars at St. Anthony, Newfoundland on January 20, 1977. Insured losses from Fiona in Canada are estimated to be at least C$800 million (US$590 million), with the total damage expected to be significantly higher, making Fiona the costliest natural disaster in Atlantic Canada history.
- January 16, 2023: An unnamed subtropical storm, operationally considered non-tropical by the National Hurricane Center, brought wind gusts of near 60 mph (100 km/h) to Nova Scotia's Sable Island on the night of January 16 while moving northward toward the Cabot Strait. This prompted Environment Canada to issue wind warnings in Cape Breton County, Nova Scotia as well as in the Wreckhouse area of Newfoundland. The following morning, the system made landfall in Louisbourg, Nova Scotia as a weakening subtropical storm with estimated wind speeds of 50 mph (80 km/h) and a minimum central pressure of 983 millibars, before becoming a post-tropical low over the St. Lawrence and dissipating over far eastern Quebec the next day.
- September 16–17, 2023: Hurricane Lee traversed each province in Atlantic Canada as an extratropical cyclone.
- August 9-10, 2024: The remnants of Hurricane Debby passed through Ontario and Quebec and brought torrential rain to the region. Insurance loss amounted to C$2.5 billion (US$1.8 billion). As such, Debby became the costliest weather events in Quebec, and the costliest tropical cyclones in Canada.
- August 19-20, 2024: Hurricane Ernesto stayed just offshore south of Newfoundland as a Category 1 hurricane, despite its close proximity to land, bringing tropical storm-force conditions, no watches or warnings were issued.

== Tables ==
Number of tropical systems Impact Canada within 60 nm of the coastline from 1951 to 2020
Type	Amount
Major Hurricanes (Cat 3+)	2
Hurricanes (Cat 1+)	30
Tropical System (Depression, Storm, and Hurricanes)	78
Extratropical and Tropical System (Extratropical cyclones and Tropical Systems)	145

Wettest tropical cyclones and their remnants in Canada Highest-known totals
Precipitation			Storm	Location	Ref.
Rank	mm	in	Storm	Location	Ref.
1	302.0	11.89	Harvey 1999	Oxford, NS	
2	249.9	9.84	Beth 1971	Halifax, NS	
3	238.0	9.37	Igor 2010	St. Lawrence, NL	
4	224.8	8.85	Matthew 2016	Sydney, NS	
5	221	8.70	Debby 2024	Lanoraie, QC	
6	213.6	8.41	Hazel 1954	Snelgrove, ON	
7	212.0	8.35	Fiona 2022	Cape North, NS	
8	210.0	8.26	Earl 2022	Paradise, NL	
9	191.0	7.52	Bertha 1990	Hunters Mountain, NS	
10	185.0	7.28	Sandy 2012	Charlevoix, QC	

Month	Number of recorded systems making landfall in Canada while still tropical since 1950
January	0
February	0
March	0
April	0
May	0
June	0
July	4
August	6
September	13
October	5
November	1
December	0

== See also ==
- List of New England hurricanes
- List of Newfoundland hurricanes
- List of Atlantic hurricane records
- Lists of Atlantic hurricanes
