= Ashdale =

Ashdale may refer to:

== Places ==
- Ashdale, Nova Scotia, a small community in Nova Scotia, Canada
- Ashdale, a community in Nepean, Ontario

== Other ==
- Ashdale Secondary College, a secondary school in Perth, Western Australia

== See also ==
- Ashvale (disambiguation)
