= Lists of Atlantic hurricanes =

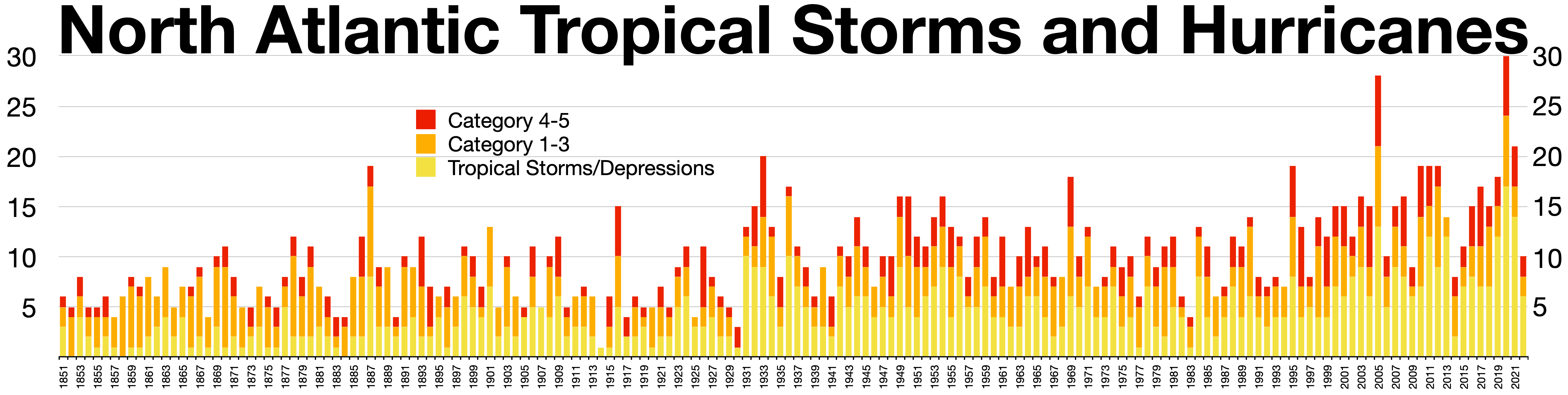
North Atlantic tropical storms and hurricanes Hurricane category 4-5 Hurricane category 1-3 Tropical storm or Tropical depression

Lists of Atlantic hurricanes, or tropical cyclones in the Atlantic Ocean, are organized by the properties of the hurricane or by the location most affected.

== By property ==
- List of Atlantic hurricane seasons
- List of Atlantic hurricane records
- List of Category 1 Atlantic hurricanes
- List of Category 2 Atlantic hurricanes
- List of Category 3 Atlantic hurricanes
- List of Category 4 Atlantic hurricanes
- List of Category 5 Atlantic hurricanes
- List of costliest Atlantic hurricanes
- List of deadliest Atlantic hurricanes
- List of off-season Atlantic hurricanes
- List of retired Atlantic hurricane names
- List of tropical cyclone-spawned tornadoes
- List of wettest tropical cyclones
  - List of wettest tropical cyclones by country
  - List of wettest tropical cyclones in the United States

== By location ==
- List of Atlantic–Pacific crossover hurricanes
- List of Azores hurricanes
- Hurricanes in the Bahama Archipelago
- List of Baja California Peninsula hurricanes
- List of Barbados hurricanes
- List of Bermuda hurricanes
- List of Canada hurricanes
  - List of Newfoundland hurricanes
- List of Cayman Islands hurricanes
- List of Cuba hurricanes
- List of Hispaniola hurricanes
- List of Jamaica hurricanes
- List of South America hurricanes
- Hurricanes in the Virgin Islands
- List of West Africa hurricanes
- South Atlantic tropical cyclone
- Tropical cyclone effects in Europe

=== United States ===
- List of United States hurricanes
- List of Alabama hurricanes
- List of Arizona hurricanes
- List of California hurricanes
- List of Delaware hurricanes
- List of Florida hurricanes
  - List of Florida hurricanes (pre-1900)
  - List of Florida hurricanes (1900–1949)
  - List of Florida hurricanes (1950–1974)
  - List of Florida hurricanes (1975–1999)
  - List of Florida hurricanes (2000–present)
- List of Georgia hurricanes
- List of Hawaii hurricanes
- List of Louisiana hurricanes (2000–present)
- List of Maryland hurricanes (1950–present)
- List of New England hurricanes
- List of New Jersey hurricanes
- List of New Mexico hurricanes
- List of New York hurricanes
- List of North Carolina hurricanes
  - List of North Carolina hurricanes (pre-1900)
  - List of North Carolina hurricanes (1900–1949)
  - List of North Carolina hurricanes (1950–1979)
  - List of North Carolina hurricanes (1980–1999)
  - List of North Carolina hurricanes (2000–present)
- List of Pennsylvania hurricanes
- List of Puerto Rico hurricanes
- List of South Carolina hurricanes
- List of Texas hurricanes
  - List of Texas hurricanes (pre–1900)
  - List of Texas hurricanes (1900–1949)
  - List of Texas hurricanes (1950–1979)
  - List of Texas hurricanes (1980–present)

== See also ==
- List of Pacific hurricanes
- Outline of tropical cyclones
