= 1874 Atlantic hurricane season =

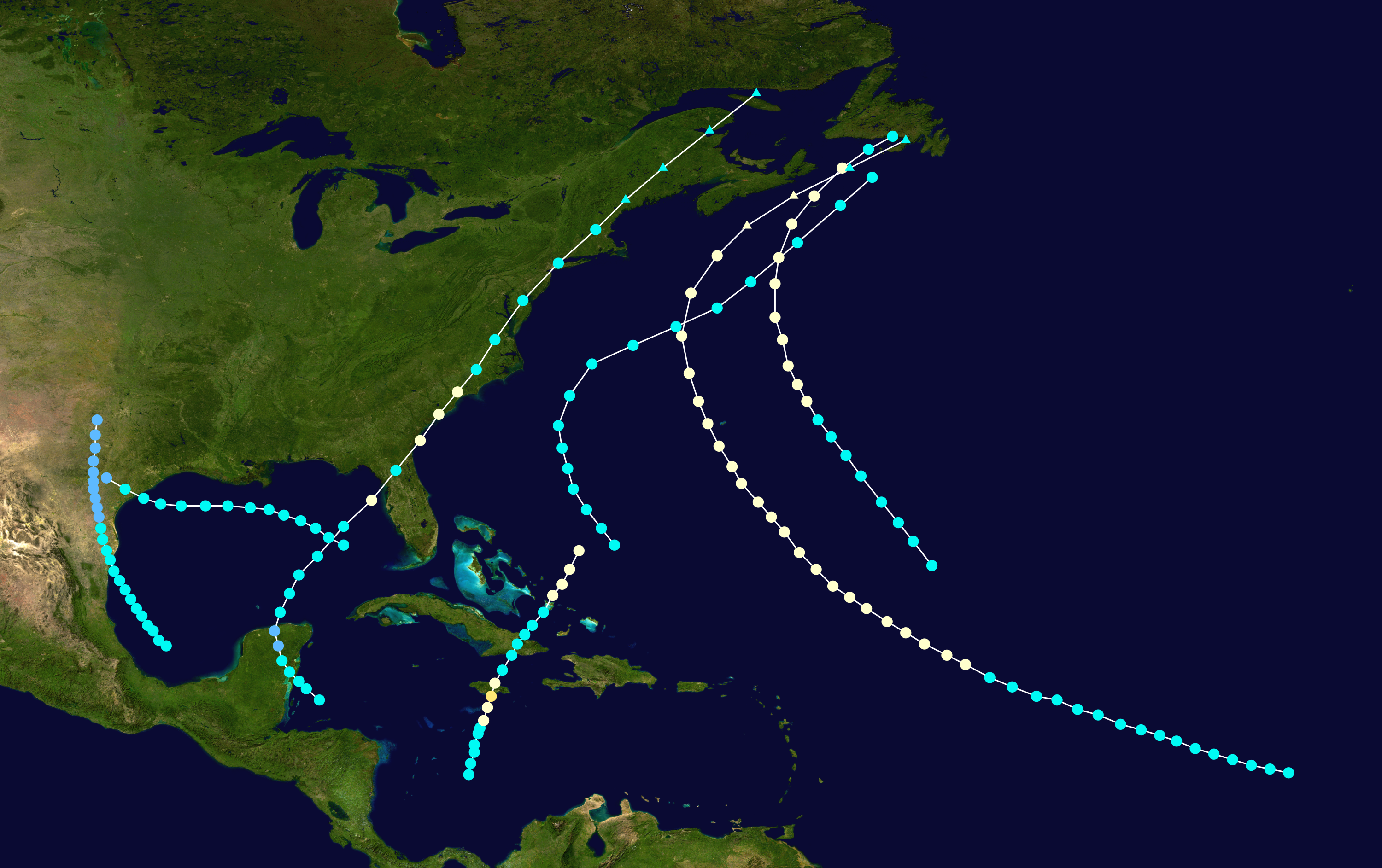
- Season summary map

Seasonal boundaries
- First system formed: July 2, 1874
- Last system dissipated: November 4, 1874

Strongest storm
- Name: Seven
  - Maximum winds: 100 mph (155 km/h) (1-minute sustained)

Seasonal statistics
- Total depressions: 7
- Total storms: 7
- Hurricanes: 4
- Total fatalities: 6
- Total damage: > $175,000 (1874 USD)

The 1874 Atlantic hurricane season featured the first hurricane to be recorded on a weather map by the United States Signal Service (the present-day National Weather Service). It was a relatively inactive season, in which seven tropical cyclones developed. Four storms intensified into hurricanes, but none attained major hurricane status. (Note: A major hurricane is a storm that ranks as Category 3 or higher on the Saffir–Simpson hurricane wind scale.) However, in the absence of modern satellite and other remote-sensing technologies, only storms that affected populated land areas or encountered ships at sea were recorded, so the actual total could be higher. An undercount bias of zero to six tropical cyclones per year between 1851 and 1885 and zero to four per year between 1886 and 1910 has been estimated.

Of the known cyclones, large alterations were made to the tracks of the third and seventh systems in 1995 by José Fernández-Partagás and Henry Díaz, who also proposed smaller changes to the known track of the sixth system. Neither Fernández-Partagás and Díaz nor the Atlantic hurricane reanalysis project introduced any previously undocumented tropical cyclones during their reanalyses of the 1874 season. Another reanalysis study, authored by climate researcher Michael Chenoweth and published in 2014, theorizes that seven cyclones formed. Chenoweth proposes the removal of the first and fifth storms from the official hurricane database (HURDAT), as well as the addition of two new storms. However, these changes have yet to be incorporated into HURDAT.

The first storm of the season was initially observed over the eastern Gulf of Mexico on July 2. Most of the systems directly impacted land. A tropical storm that developed in the Bay of Campeche during the month of September killed one person and caused significant damage in northeastern Mexico and south Texas after striking Tamaulipas and moving northward. The sixth storm of the season, and also the third hurricane, struck Florida as a Category 1 hurricane before making a second landfall in South Carolina at the same intensity in late September. This cyclone inflicted at least $100,000 (1874 USD; $2.49 million in 2024) in damage to rice crops in the Savannah area of Georgia alone. (Note: All damage figures are in 1874 USD, unless otherwise noted) The seventh, final, and strongest system of the season developed in the Caribbean Sea on October 31, and made landfall in Jamaica as a Category 2 hurricane, causing at least five fatalities and $75,000 ($1.87 million in 2024) in damage there. After striking eastern Cuba and the Bahamas as a tropical storm, the storm was last sighted to the north of the latter on November 4, as a Category 1 hurricane.

== Season summary ==
The Atlantic hurricane database (HURDAT) officially recognizes seven tropical cyclones from the 1874 season. Four storms attained hurricane status, with winds of 75 mph (120 km/h) or greater. However, none of those intensified into a major hurricane. No previously undocumented cyclones were added by meteorologists José Fernández-Partagás and Henry Díaz in 1995 or by the Atlantic hurricane reanalysis project. A 2014 study by climate researcher Michael Chenoweth also did not propose a net gain or loss of the number of storms in 1874 but did recommend the removal of the season's first and fifth systems. The study argued for significant changes to the season's fourth system, suggesting that it strengthened into a Category 3 major hurricane. Chenoweth's study utilizes a more extensive collection of newspapers and ship logs, as well as late 19th century weather maps for the first time, in comparison to previous reanalysis projects. These changes are yet to be incorporated into HURDAT.

The first storm of the season was a tropical storm that formed in the Gulf of Mexico during the month of July. The system made landfall near Galveston, Texas, on July 5. Two systems are known to have developed in August, the first of which struck Newfoundland as a tropical storm and the second also made landfall there but as an extratropical cyclone. Both storms peaked as a Category 1 hurricane on the modern-day Saffir–Simpson scale. In early September, another tropical system developed in the Bay of Campeche and made landfall in northeast Mexico with winds up to 60 mph (95 km/h), causing significant damage there and in south Texas as well as one fatality in the latter. September featured two other systems, including the season's sixth cyclone, which crossed the Yucatán Peninsula and then made two landfalls at hurricane intensity in the United States, first in Florida and then in South Carolina. About $100,000 ($2.49 million in 2024) in damage to rice crops occurred in Georgia's Savannah area alone. This was the first hurricane to ever be shown on a weather map. The seventh, final, and strongest hurricane (by sustained winds) of the season existed over the southwestern Caribbean Sea by October 31. Peaking as a Category 2 hurricane with maximum sustained winds of 105 mph (165 km/h), the cyclone struck Jamaica at this intensity. Five fatalities and severe damage occurred in parts of Jamaica, reaching $75,000 ($1.87 million in 2024) in the Kingston area alone. After crossing eastern Cuba and the Bahamas as a tropical storm, the system re-strengthened into a hurricane while north of the Bahamas, where it was last sighted on November 4.

The season's activity was reflected with an accumulated cyclone energy (ACE) rating of 47, the lowest total of the decade, despite featuring more storms than 1872, 1873, 1875, and 1876. ACE is a metric used to express the energy used by a tropical cyclone during its lifetime. Therefore, a storm with a longer duration will have higher values of ACE. It is only calculated at six-hour increments in which specific tropical and subtropical systems are either at or above sustained wind speeds of 39 mph (63 km/h), which is the threshold for tropical storm intensity. Thus, tropical depressions are not included here.

== Systems ==
=== Tropical Storm One ===
- Tropical storm (SSHWS)
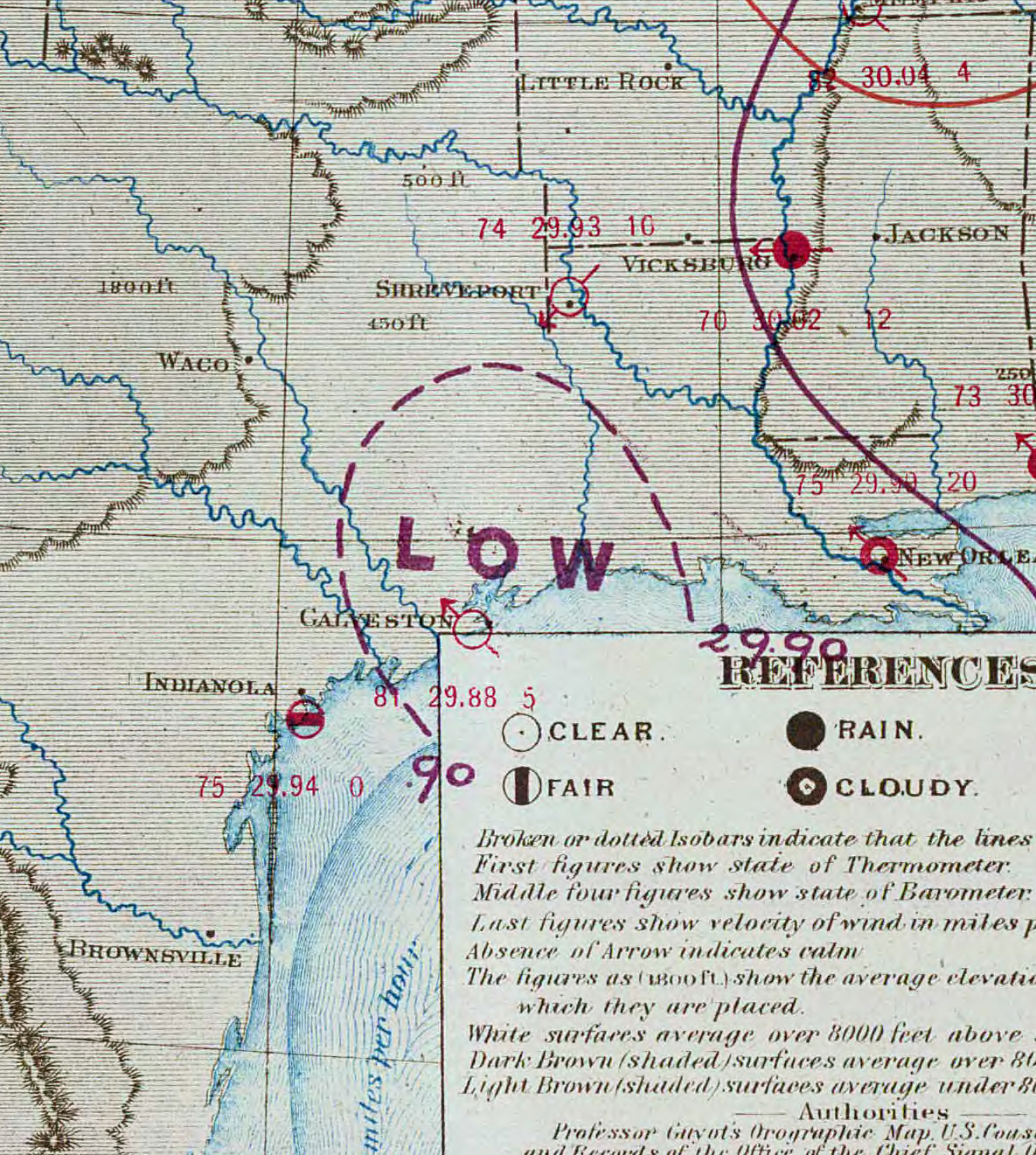
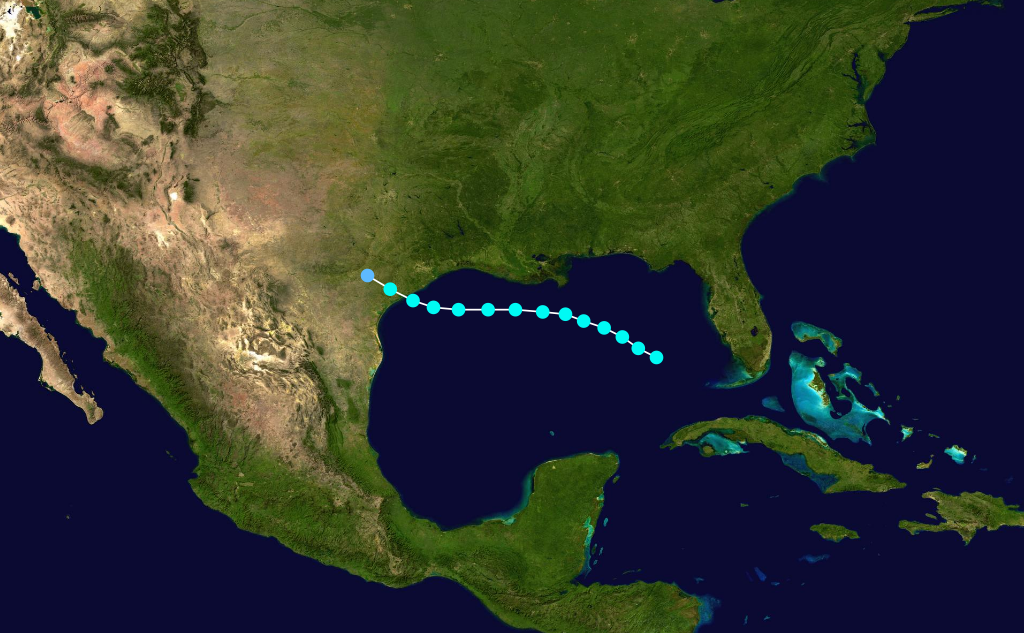
- Duration: July 2 – July 5
- Peak intensity: 60 mph (95 km/h) (1-min);

Based on the Monthly Weather Review, a tropical storm was first noted over the east-central Gulf of Mexico on July 2 about 200 mi (320 km) west-southwest of present-day Naples, Florida. Moving westward, the tropical storm steadily strengthened to reach a peak intensity of 60 mph (95 km/h) on July 3. The system later made landfall near Port O'Connor, Texas, on July 5, likely around the same intensity, and then rapidly dissipated shortly after moving inland that same day. In the vicinity of Indianola, Texas, the storm blew down fledgling settlements and sank ships, seriously hindering coastal trade. Climate researcher Michael Chenoweth proposed the removal of this storm in a 2014 study, noting there was "No evidence in land-based reports or from ships".

=== Hurricane Two ===
- Category 1 hurricane (SSHWS)
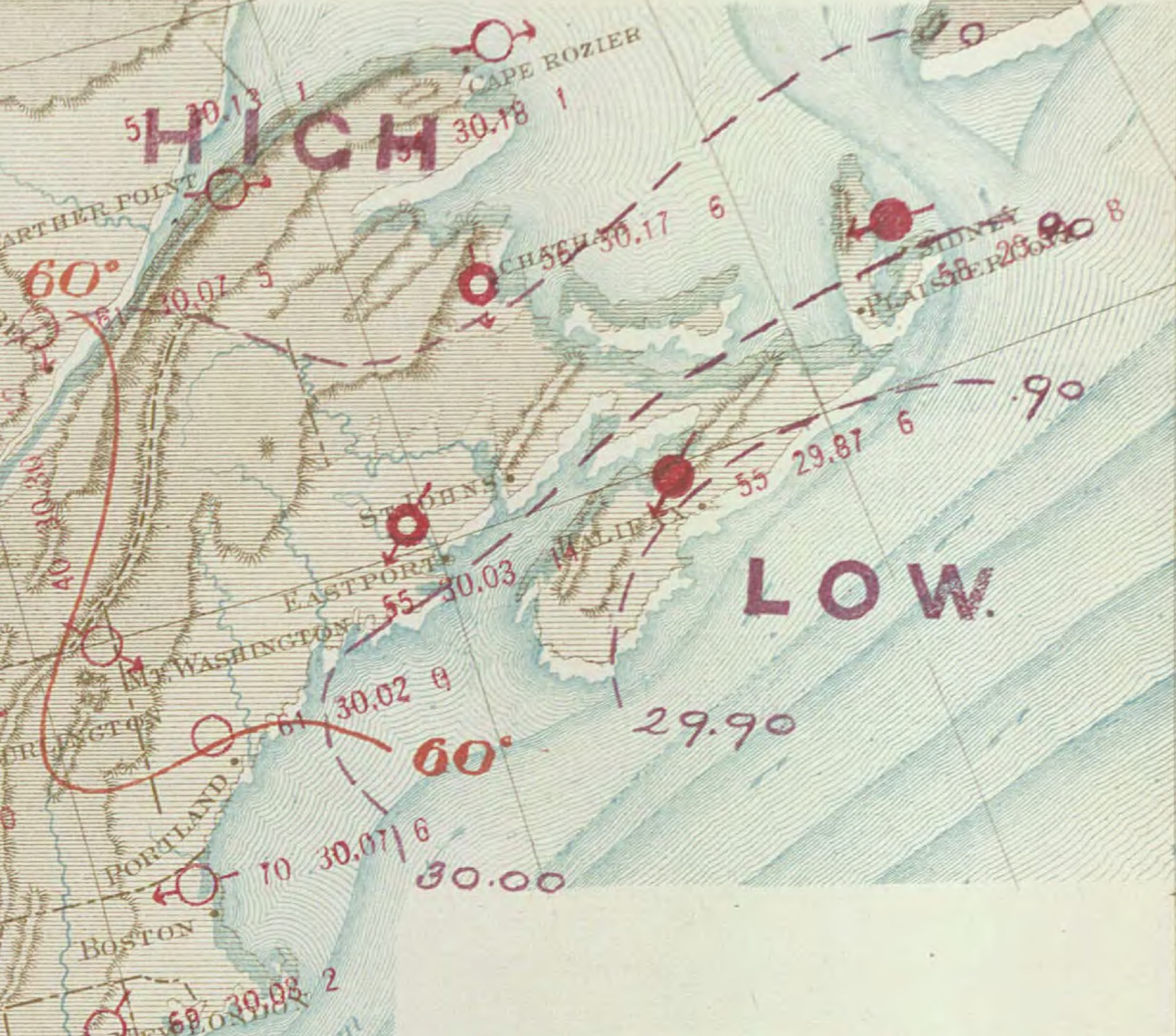
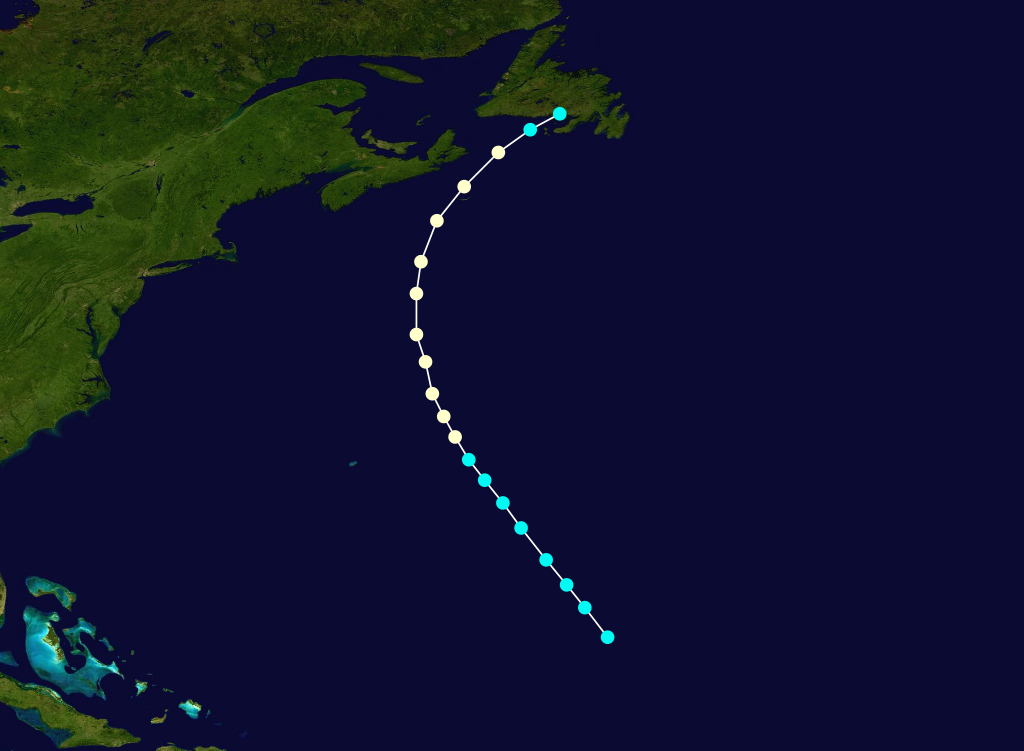
- Duration: August 3 – August 7
- Peak intensity: 80 mph (130 km/h) (1-min);

Although the no observations of this system exist prior to August 5, a 1993 reanalysis by C. J. Neumann and others began the track of cyclone two days earlier, about 700 mi (1,125 km) northeast of the Lesser Antilles. Slowly gaining strength, the system reached hurricane status and peaked with maximum sustained winds of 80 mph (130 km/h) while located just northeast of the island of Bermuda on August 5, based on a ship recording sustained winds of 81 mph (130 km/h). Late on August 6, the storm turned northeastward as it approached Atlantic Canada. The system then weakened back to a tropical storm on August 7, and made landfall on Newfoundland the same day, with sustained winds up to 70 mph (110 km/h). It dissipated shortly afterwards. Chenoweth theorized that this system developed as a subtropical storm offshore the Mid-Atlantic and moved mostly northeastward. The storm transitioned into a tropical storm but failed to attain hurricane status prior to becoming extratropical late on August 6, almost 24 hours before reaching Newfoundland.

=== Hurricane Three ===
- Category 1 hurricane (SSHWS)
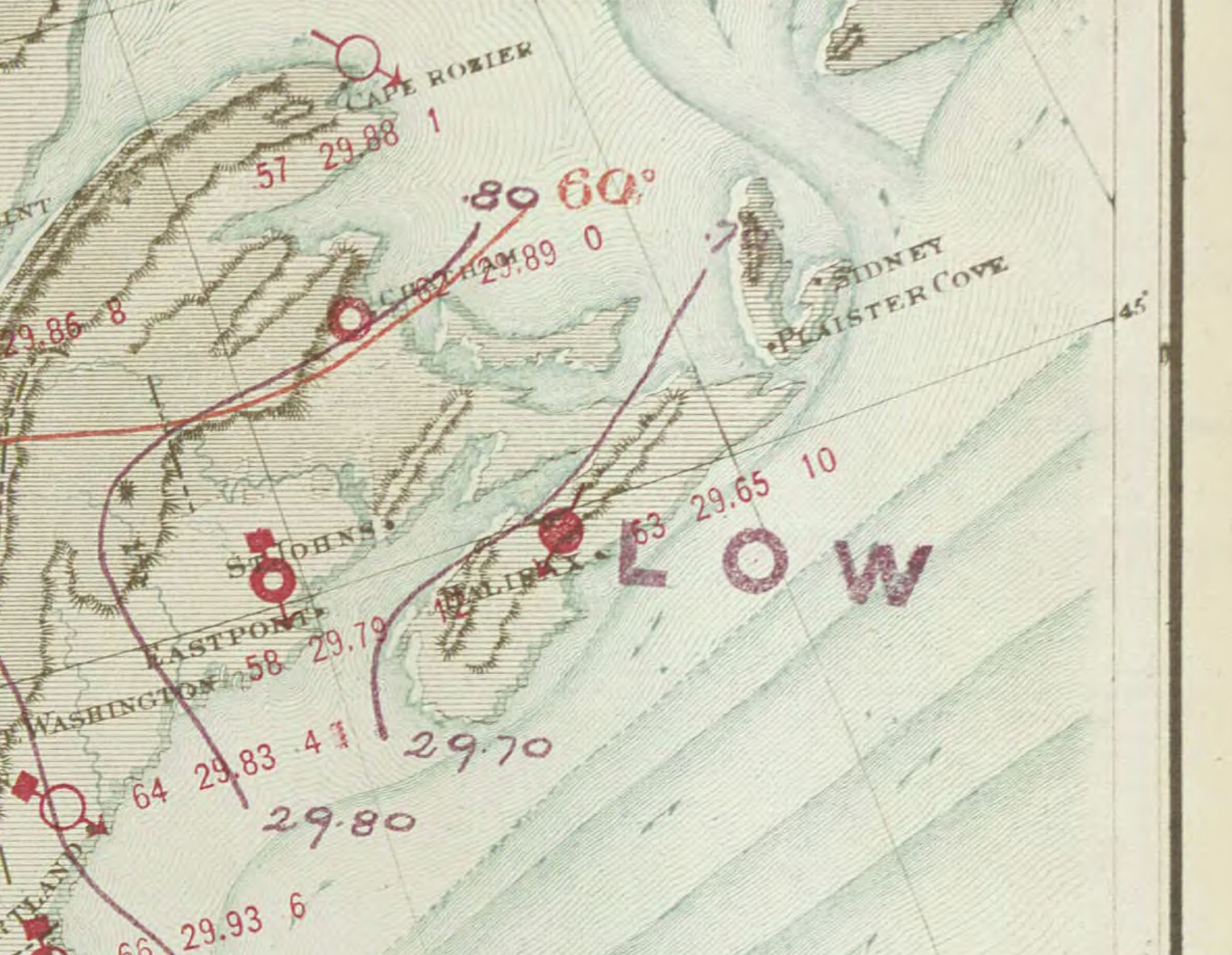
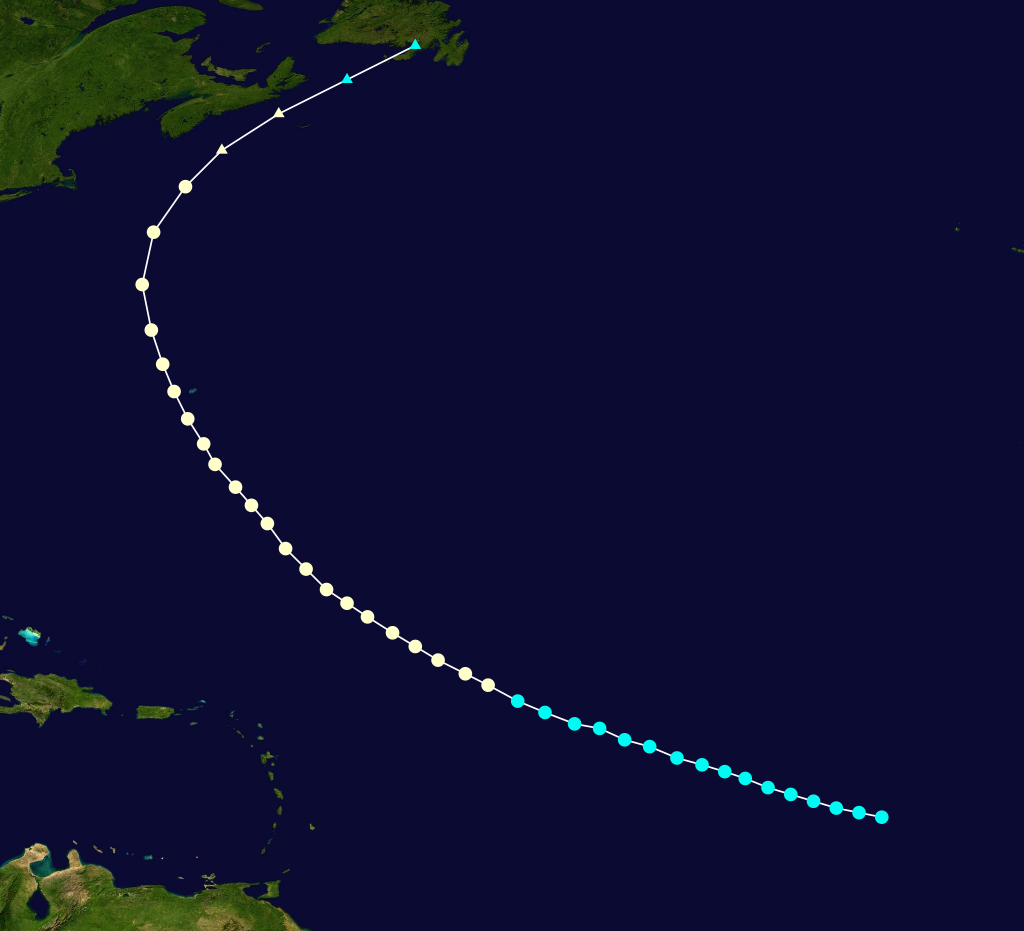
- Duration: August 29 – September 7
- Peak intensity: 90 mph (150 km/h) (1-min); ≤980 mbar (hPa)

The bark Colchaqua encountered this storm nearly 900 mi (1,450 km) west of the Capo Verde Islands on August 29, recording sustained winds of 46 mph (74 km/h). Moving towards the west-northwest, the storm steadily gained strength, and reached hurricane strength early on September 2. The storm peaked its peak intensity of September 6 with sustained winds of 90 mph (150 km/h) and a minimum atmospheric pressure of 980 mbar (29 inHg), the former recorded by the ship Swallow and the latter by the ship State of Virginia. Moving just to the west of Bermuda, the cyclone began to turn more northerly, and transitioned into an extratropical cyclone later on September 7. By the following day, the system made landfall in Newfoundland as an extratropical system. On Bermuda, the hurricane generated huge swells and strong winds, causing sea spray that defoliated plants across the territory. Approximately 1 in (25 mm) of rain fell in Halifax, Nova Scotia, during a 3.5 hour-period as a result of the storm. The 2014 reanalysis study by Chenoweth concludes that this storm formed on September 2 and intensified more than HURDAT suggests, peaking as a strong Category 2 hurricane.

=== Tropical Storm Four ===
- Tropical storm (SSHWS)
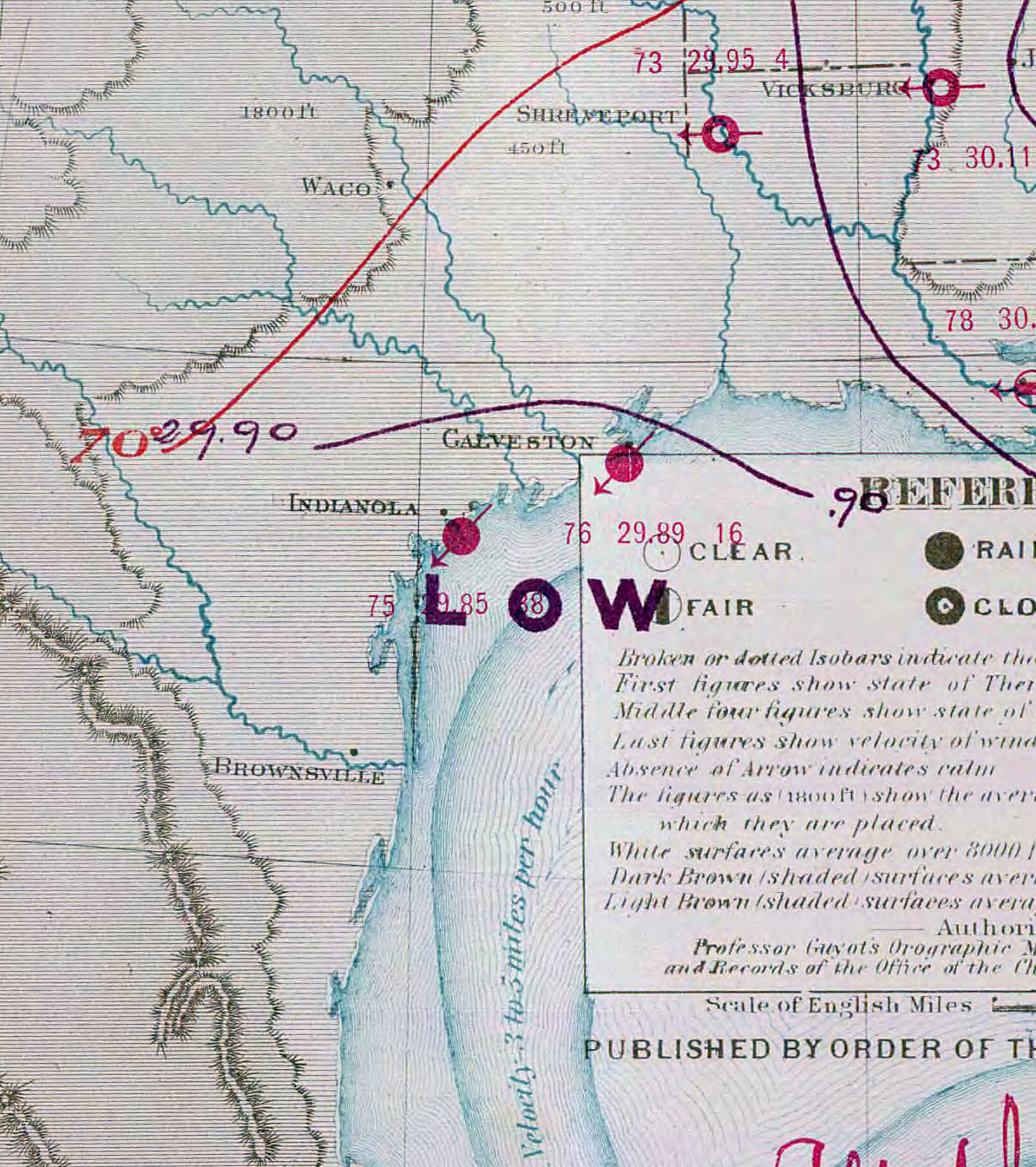
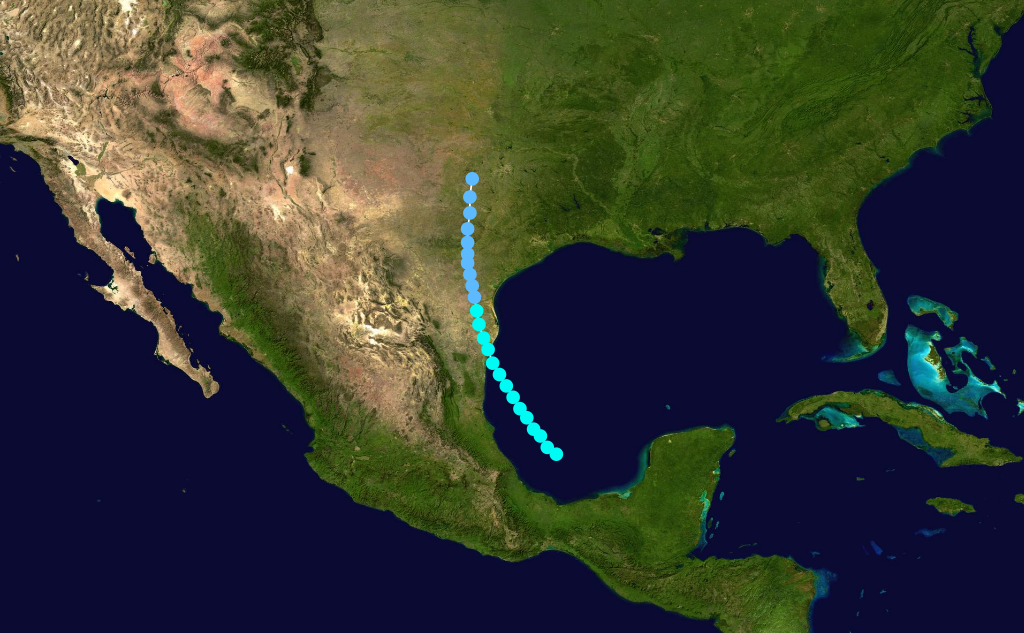
- Duration: September 2 – September 7
- Peak intensity: 60 mph (95 km/h) (1-min);

On September 2, a tropical storm developed in the Bay of Campeche. Moving generally towards the west-northwest, the storm reached a peak intensity of 60 mph (95 km/h) on September 4, while approaching northeastern Mexico. Shortly thereafter, the cyclone made landfall in northern Tamaulipas and weakened into a tropical depression on September 5, several hours after crossing into Texas. Moving northward through the state, the storm dissipated on September 7, while located to the southwest of the Dallas–Fort Worth area. Chenoweth argued that this system developed as a tropical depression near the central Gulf of Mexico on September 1 and became much more intense, reaching Category 3 intensity on September 5. The system struck south Texas later that day.

In Mexico, the storm demolished some homes and all huts along the coast in Bagdad. Telegraph wires in the town were also almost completely destroyed. Farther inland, towns in Nuevo León reported flooding, with several bridges swept away in the vicinity of Cerralvo. The system generated rough seas along the coast of Texas, especially in Corpus Christi. Waves destroyed bathhouses and wharves and beached several schooners, some of which collided with homes and trees. Abnormally high tides also destroyed salt lakes on Padre Island, ending a salt boom. The storm was responsible for destroying the Brazos Santiago lighthouse and causing one fatality. The town of Indianola observed sustained winds of 46 mph (74 km/h).

=== Tropical Storm Five ===
- Tropical storm (SSHWS)
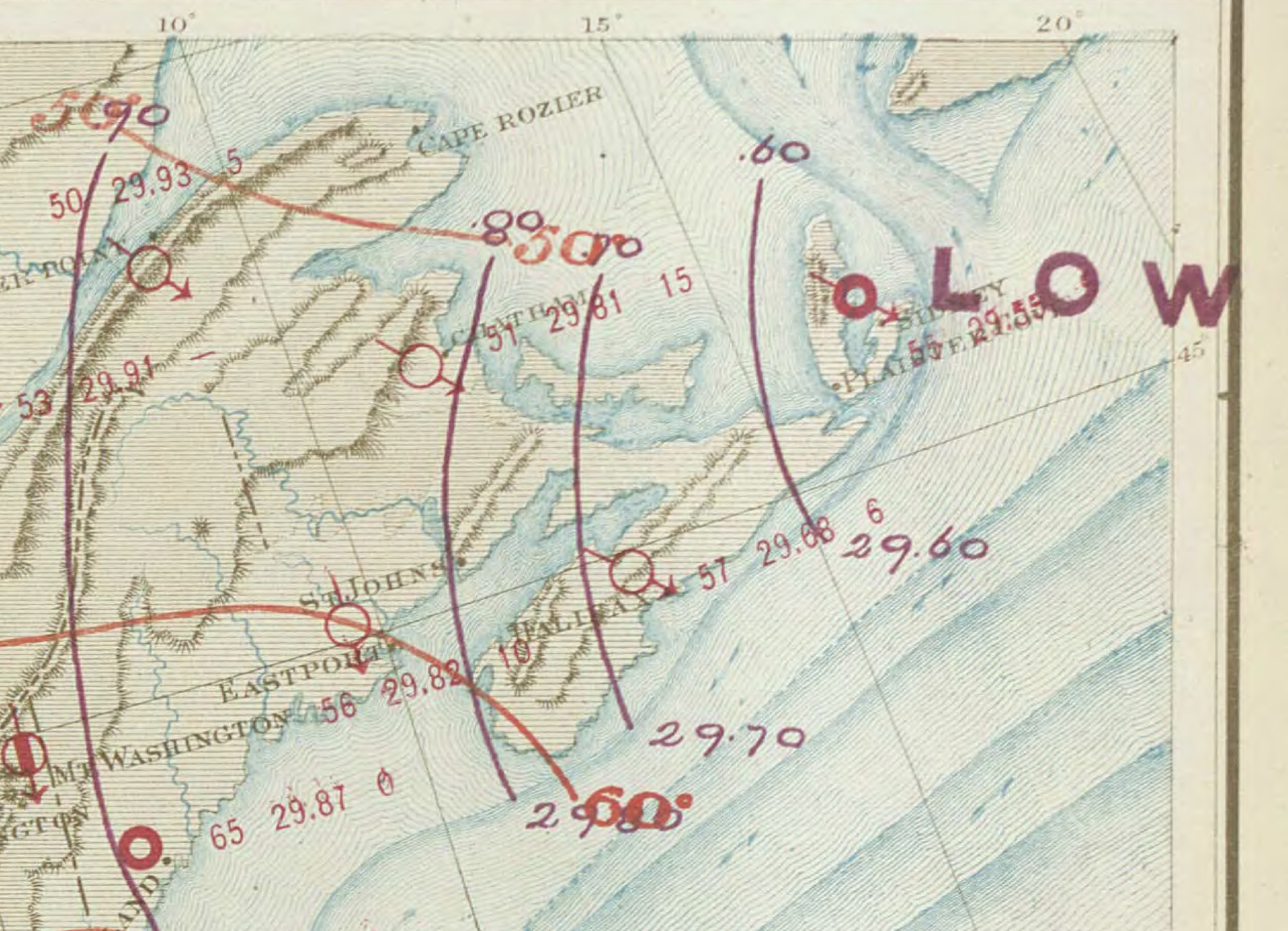
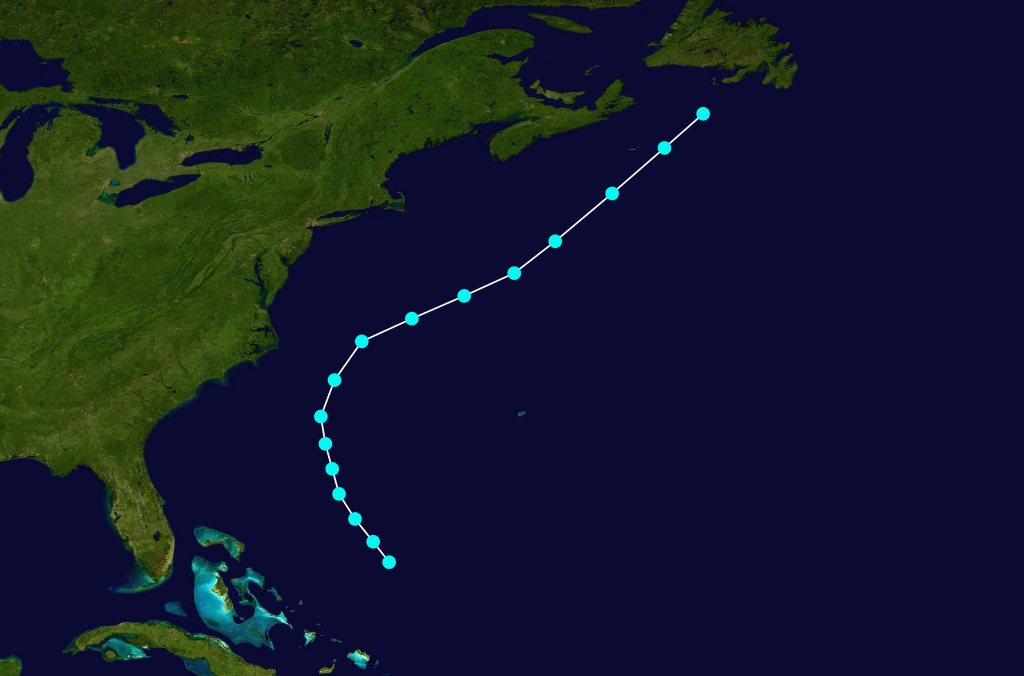
- Duration: September 8 – September 11
- Peak intensity: 60 mph (95 km/h) (1-min);

Based on a combination of the tracks created by Ivan Ray Tannehill in 1938 and a reanalysis led by C. J. Neumann in 1993, HURDAT records the beginning of the path of a tropical storm about 275 mi (445 km) north of Turks and Caicos Islands on September 8. Moving towards the west-northwest, the system is estimated to maintained sustained winds of 60 mph (95 km/h) as it passed between North Carolina and Bermuda. Turning towards the northeast, it was last observed to the south of Newfoundland on September 11. Chenoweth argued for the removal of this cyclone from HURDAT, noting there was "No evidence in land-based reports or from ships". A ship known as Titan recorded sustained winds of September 12. However, it could not be determined if the Titan actually encountered the storm, given that the location was not logged.

=== Hurricane Six ===
- Category 1 hurricane (SSHWS)
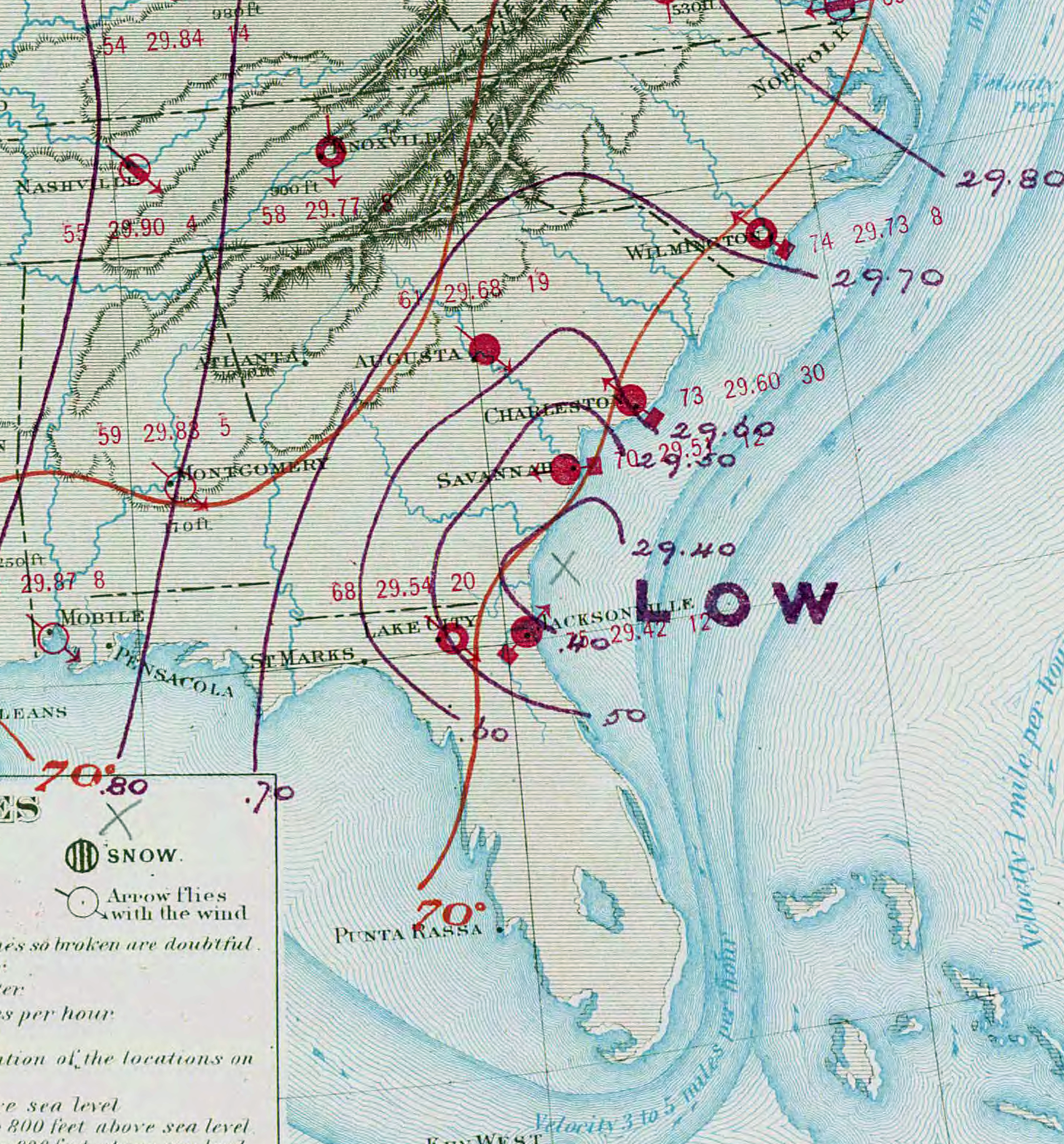
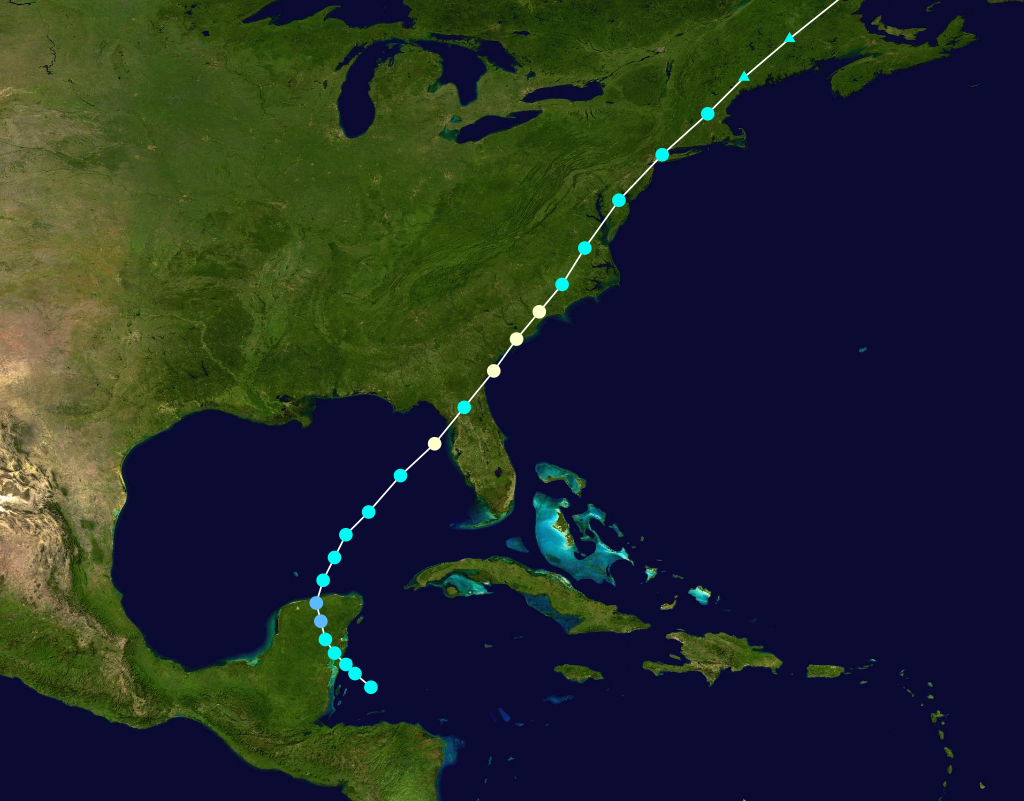
- Duration: September 25 – September 30
- Peak intensity: 90 mph (150 km/h) (1-min); 981 mbar (hPa)

On September 25, a tropical storm was first noted in the western Caribbean, north of Honduras. Upon striking the Yucatán Peninsula shortly afterwards, the storm briefly weakened into a tropical depression. However, when the system emerged into the Gulf of Mexico, it attained tropical storm status once again. Steadily gaining strength, the cyclone reached hurricane status on September 28, after reports from the ship Emma D. Finney indicated such. Moving north-northeastward, the storm made landfall near Cedar Key, Florida several hours later, with an estimated minimum central pressure of 981 mbar (29.0 inHg). The system briefly fell to tropical storm status over the state, but strengthened into a hurricane again after exiting near Jacksonville and crossing the Gulf Stream. It hit South Carolina as a hurricane that same day, with the center passing just east of Charleston and west of Wilmington. The storm lost hurricane status again over eastern North Carolina. Thereafter, the system crossed the northeastern United States, becoming extratropical on September 30 over Maine. On October 1, it dissipated over eastern Canada.

Few reports of damage in Florida exist. Jacksonville observed sustained winds of 48 mph (77 km/h). Stronger winds impacted coastal Georgia, with a sustained wind speed of 68 mph (109 km/h) at the Tybee Island Lighthouse. Tides generated by the storm inundated portions of the island with up to 3 ft (0.91 m) of water. Heavy rainfall in the Savannah area raised the height of the river to its highest height in 20 years and flooded many rice plantations, causing about $100,000 ($2.49 million in 2024) in damage. Coastal flooding also occurred in South Carolina, including in Charleston, where parts of The Battery were swept away. In North Carolina, Virginia, and several other states to the north, there were reports of trees being brought down, and shipping disrupted. At Smithville (present-day Southport) several houses, warehouses, telegraph lines and railroad bridges were destroyed. Additionally, about 33% of rice crops along the Cape Fear River were damaged. This was also the first hurricane ever to be recorded on a weather map by the U.S. Weather Bureau. The reanalysis study authored by Chenoweth proposed few changes to this system compared to HURDAT, other than some small eastward and westward along different sections of the track and a slightly earlier extratropical transition.

=== Hurricane Seven ===
- Category 2 hurricane (SSHWS)
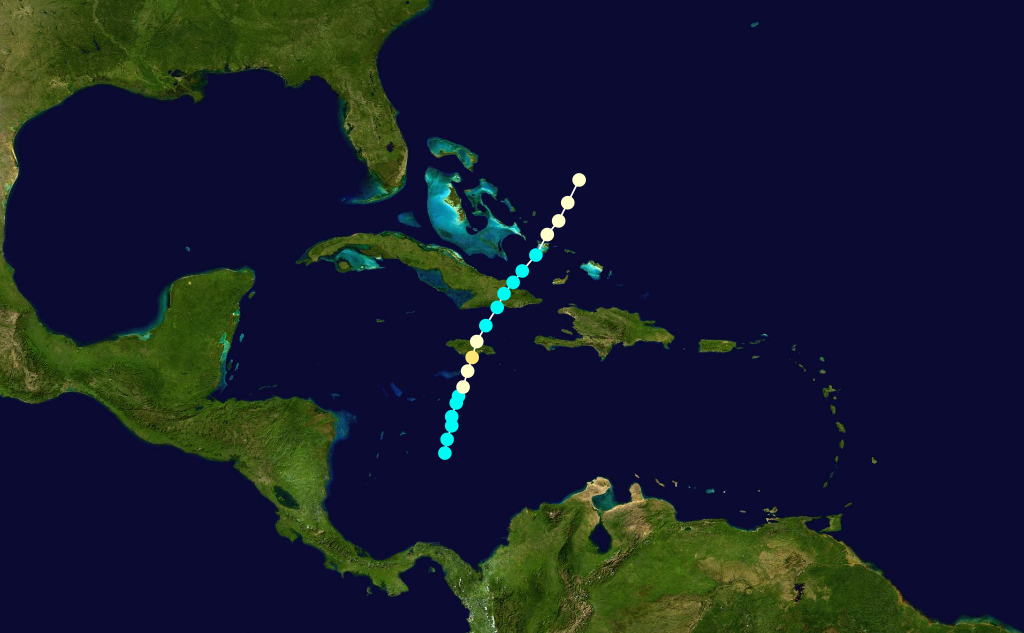
- Duration: October 31 – November 4
- Peak intensity: 105 mph (165 km/h) (1-min);

The track for this storm begins about 290 mi (465 km) northwest of Barranquilla, Colombia, on October 31, one day before Jamaica first observed sustained hurricane-force winds. Moving towards the east-northeast, the storm attained hurricane status on November 1, while situated just south of Jamaica. Upon making landfall in the island nation near Rocky Pointon November 2, the storm strengthened into a Category 2 hurricane with 105 mph (165 km/h) winds. After crossing Jamaica, the system weakened into a Category 1 hurricane and then further into a tropical storm prior to making landfall in eastern Cuba late on November 2. The system emerged in the Bahamas on the next day, and strengthened into a hurricane once again early on November 4. Several hours later, the hurricane was last sighted to the northeast of the Bahamas.

Jamaica experienced its worst hurricane in more than 40 years. Kingston reported sustained winds of 81 mph (130 km/h). According to a telegraph from the city, the hurricane wrecked or destroyed 17 vessels. Heavy rains led to landslides and floods that swept away some bridges and animals throughout the island, while winds toppled many trees and damaged crops, especially plantains, yam, sugar cane, and coffee. The hurricane also severely damaged or destroyed a number of homes. At least five deaths occurred and damage in the Kingston area alone reached $75,000 ($1.87 million in 2024). Chenoweth's study begins the track of this storm to the southeast of Jamaica. The storm instead moves northwestward across the island and then curved north-northeastward thereafter, striking Cuba north of Manzanillo. Thereafter, the cyclone treks slightly farther west over the Bahamas.

=== Other storms ===
Chenoweth proposed two other storms not currently listed in HURDAT. The first such system formed over the western Atlantic on August 23. Attaining hurricane status on the next day, the cyclone meandered slowly for about a week before dissipating on August 30 while well offshore the Southeastern United States. Chenoweth's second unofficial storm began over the central Atlantic on September 14 about halfway between Bermuda and the Azores. Moving generally northeastward, Chenoweth last documented the cyclone west-northwest of the Azores on September 16.

== Seasonal effects ==
This is a table of all of the known storms that formed in the 1874 Atlantic hurricane season. It includes their known duration (within the basin), areas affected, damages, and death totals. Deaths in parentheses are additional and indirect (an example of an indirect death would be a traffic accident), but were still related to that storm. Damage and deaths include totals while the storm was extratropical, a wave, or a low, and all of the damage figures are in 1874 USD.

Saffir–Simpson scale
TD	TS	C1	C2	C3	C4	C5

1874 North Atlantic tropical cyclone season statistics
Storm name	Dates active	Storm category at peak intensity	Max 1-min wind mph (km/h)	Min. press. (mbar)	Areas affected	Damage (US$)	Deaths	Ref(s).
One	July 2–5	Tropical storm	60 (95)	Unknown	Texas	Unknown	None	
Two	August 3–7	Category 1 hurricane	80 (130)	Unknown	Atlantic Canada (Newfoundland)	Unknown	None	
Three	August 29–September 7	Category 1 hurricane	90 (150)	≤980	Bermuda, Atlantic Canada	Unknown	None	
Four	September 2–7	Tropical storm	60 (95)	Unknown	Tamaulipas, Nuevo León, Texas	Unknown	1	
Five	September 8–11	Tropical storm	60 (95)	Unknown	Newfoundland	Unknown	None	
Six	September 25–September 30	Category 1 hurricane	80 (130)	981	East Coast of the United States (Florida and South Carolina)	>$100,000 ($2.49 million in 2024)	Unknown	
Seven	October 31–November 4	Category 2 hurricane	105 (165)	Unknown	Greater Antilles (Jamaica and Cuba), the Bahamas	>$75,000 ($1.87 million in 2024)	5	
Season aggregates
7 systems	July 2–November 4		105 (165)	≤980		>$175,000 ($4.37 million in 2024)	6	

== See also ==
- Atlantic hurricane season
- List of Newfoundland hurricanes
- Tropical cyclone observation
- Atlantic hurricane reanalysis project
