= Ashvale =

Ashvale may refer to:

- Ashvale, Blaenau Gwent, a Welsh village
- The Ashvale, a Scottish restaurant chain of fish and chip restaurants

== See also ==
- Ashdale (disambiguation)
