= Hurricane Maria (2011) =

Category 1 Atlantic hurricane in 2011

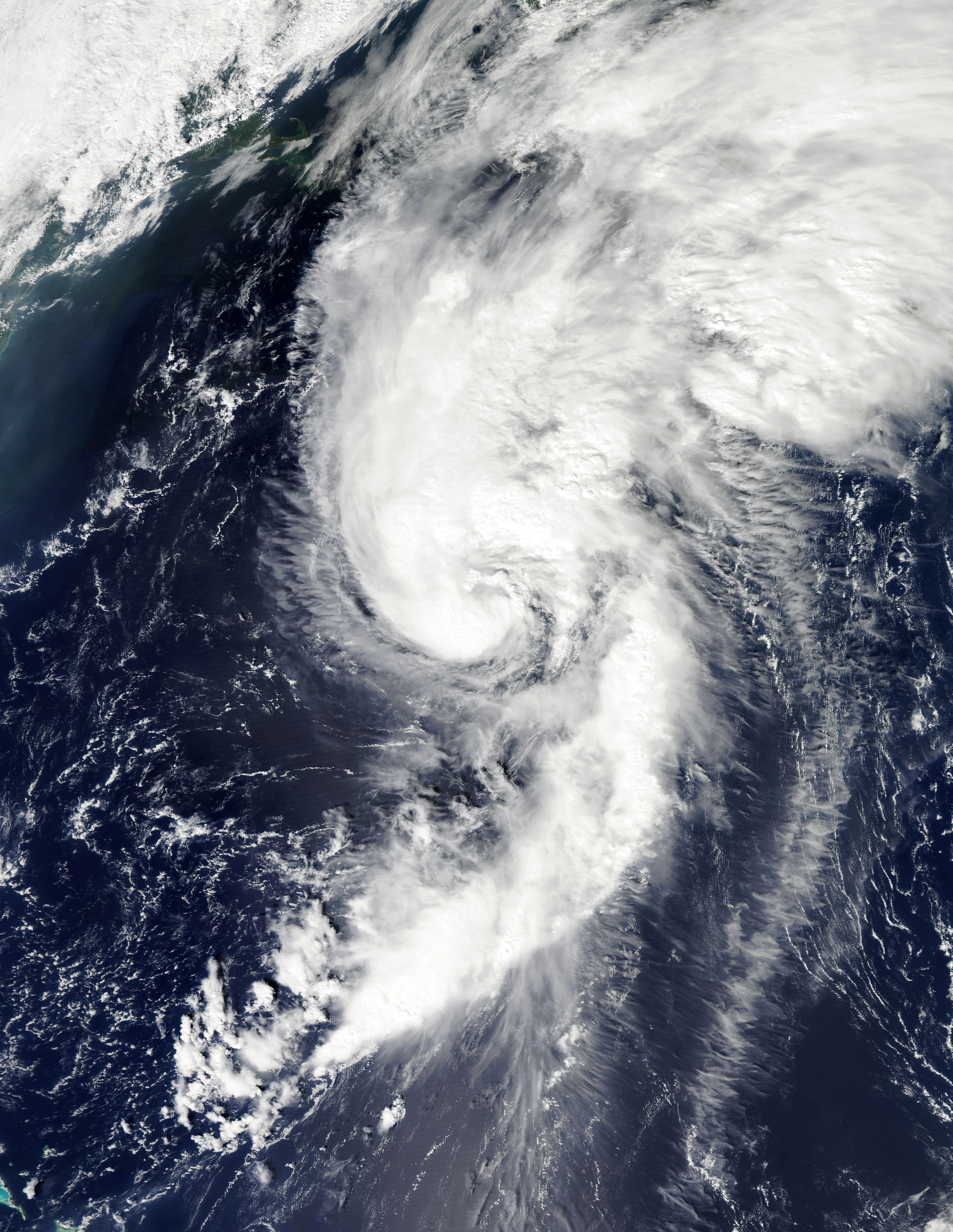
- Maria shortly before being upgraded to a hurricane on September 15

Meteorological history
- Formed: September 6, 2011
- Extratropical: September 16, 2011
- Dissipated: September 18, 2011

Category 1 hurricane
- 1-minute sustained (SSHWS/NWS)
- Highest winds: 80 mph (130 km/h)
- Lowest pressure: 983 mbar (hPa); 29.03 inHg

Overall effects
- Fatalities: None reported
- Damage: $1.3 million (2011 USD)
- Areas affected: Lesser Antilles, Bermuda, Newfoundland, Europe
- IBTrACS
- Part of the 2011 Atlantic hurricane season

Hurricane Maria was a Category 1 hurricane that made landfall on the island of Newfoundland during September 2011. Originating from a tropical wave over the central Atlantic on September 6, Maria moved toward the west and slowly strengthened. While approaching the northern Leeward Islands, however, the system entered a region of higher vertical wind shear and cooler sea surface temperatures, causing it to degenerate into a low-pressure area. It slowly curved toward the north and northeast around the western periphery of the subtropical ridge, and regained tropical storm status on September 10. Maria further strengthened to attain hurricane status while making its closest approach to Bermuda. The cyclone attained peak winds of 80 mph (130 km/h) on September 16, but weakened thereafter because of an increase in wind shear and cooler sea surface temperatures. Maria made landfall on the southeastern coast of Newfoundland during the afternoon hours of September 16 before becoming absorbed by a frontal system later on that same day.

Despite its poor organization, Maria brought heavy rainfall to portions of the east Caribbean, notably Puerto Rico. Numerous roadways and homes were flooded, and as the storm passed through the extreme northeastern Caribbean, over 15,000 people went without power. In addition, tropical storm-force winds were observed on many of the U.S. Virgin Islands. As the system passed west of Bermuda, brief tropical storm-force sustained winds were recorded, along with higher gusts; rainfall on the island, however, was minimal. In Newfoundland, strong winds were recorded, but rainfall totals were relatively minimal. There were no deaths reported in association with Maria, although the storm caused $1.3 million (2011 USD) in damage.

== Meteorological history ==
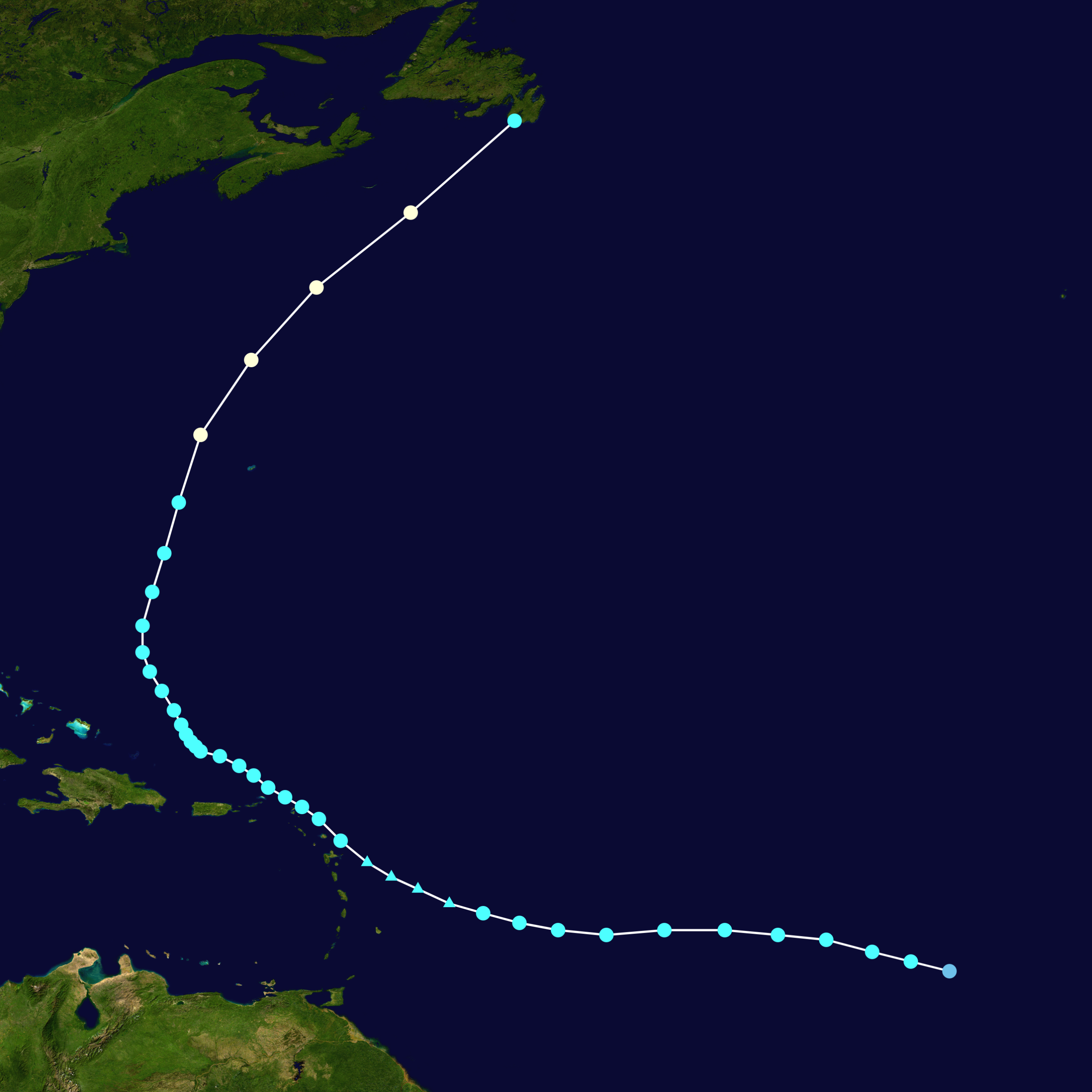
Map plotting the storm's track and intensity, according to the Saffir–Simpson scale Map key Saffir–Simpson scale Tropical depression (≤38 mph, ≤62 km/h) Tropical storm (39–73 mph, 63–118 km/h) Category 1 (74–95 mph, 119–153 km/h) Category 2 (96–110 mph, 154–177 km/h) Category 3 (111–129 mph, 178–208 km/h) Category 4 (130–156 mph, 209–251 km/h) Category 5 (≥157 mph, ≥252 km/h) Unknown Storm type Tropical cyclone Subtropical cyclone Extratropical cyclone, remnant low, tropical disturbance, or monsoon depression

The origins of Hurricane Maria can be traced back to a tropical wave—an elongated trough of low pressure oriented north to south—that moved westward from Nigeria to Senegal on September 1. The wave entered the eastern tropical Atlantic early the following day and slowly strengthened. By September 6, it had developed a sufficient amount of convection to be designated as Tropical Depression Fourteen, while it was about 700 mi (1,100 km) west-southwest of the southern Cape Verde Islands. By this time, it had also developed well-established outflow within the western semicircle of the low-pressure center. The depression continued to increase in strength, and it was upgraded to a tropical storm six hours after formation, receiving the name Maria.

Tropical Storm Maria near the Lesser Antilles on September 10

Early on September 7, the National Hurricane Center (NHC) noted that although Maria was in an area of favorable atmospheric conditions, most intensity guidance models did not anticipate any strengthening. The system changed little in organization over the next 24 hours as it moved rapidly toward the west-northwest around the southern periphery of the subtropical ridge. Though visible satellite imagery depicted a well-organized circulation center, it was displaced from the strongest convection due to increased vertical wind shear. The system reached an initial peak intensity with maximum sustained winds of 50 mph (80 km/h) on September 8 before the unfavorable environment began to impede the system's organization. Following a reconnaissance flight into the system early on September 9, it was noted that Maria had degenerated into a tropical disturbance, despite reports of tropical storm-force winds in the northern Leeward Islands. Operationally, however, the NHC kept the system classified as a tropical cyclone and never downgraded it to a disturbance. When the system approached the northern Leeward Islands on September 10, satellite imagery and surface observations revealed an increase in its organization; a subsequent reconnaissance aircraft into the disturbance revealed that the remnants of Maria had regenerated into a tropical cyclone about 40 mi (64 km) east-southeast of Antigua.

After reaching the southwestern periphery of the subtropical ridge, Maria turned to the north as its forward motion slowed considerably. Strong vertical wind shear over the system began to relax by September 14, allowing Maria to slowly restrengthen as the convection redeveloped near its center. At 1800 UTC on September 15, Maria reached Category 1 hurricane status on the Saffir–Simpson Hurricane Scale while located roughly 135 mi (217 km) northwest of Bermuda. Embedded within increasing atmospheric flow, the hurricane's forward motion accelerated towards the northeast. At 0000 UTC on September 16, Maria attained its peak intensity with winds of 80 mph (130 km/h) and a minimum barometric pressure of 983 mbar (29.0 inHg). Continuing on a northeastward course, Maria began to move over an area with cooler sea surface temperatures and higher vertical wind shear. Around 1800 UTC, Maria weakened to a tropical storm and made landfall near Cape St. Mary's, Newfoundland at 1830 UTC with winds of 70 mph (110 km/h). Shortly thereafter, the cyclone's circulation was absorbed by a frontal system over the Avalon Peninsula of Newfoundland, on September 18.

== Preparations and impact ==
=== Caribbean ===
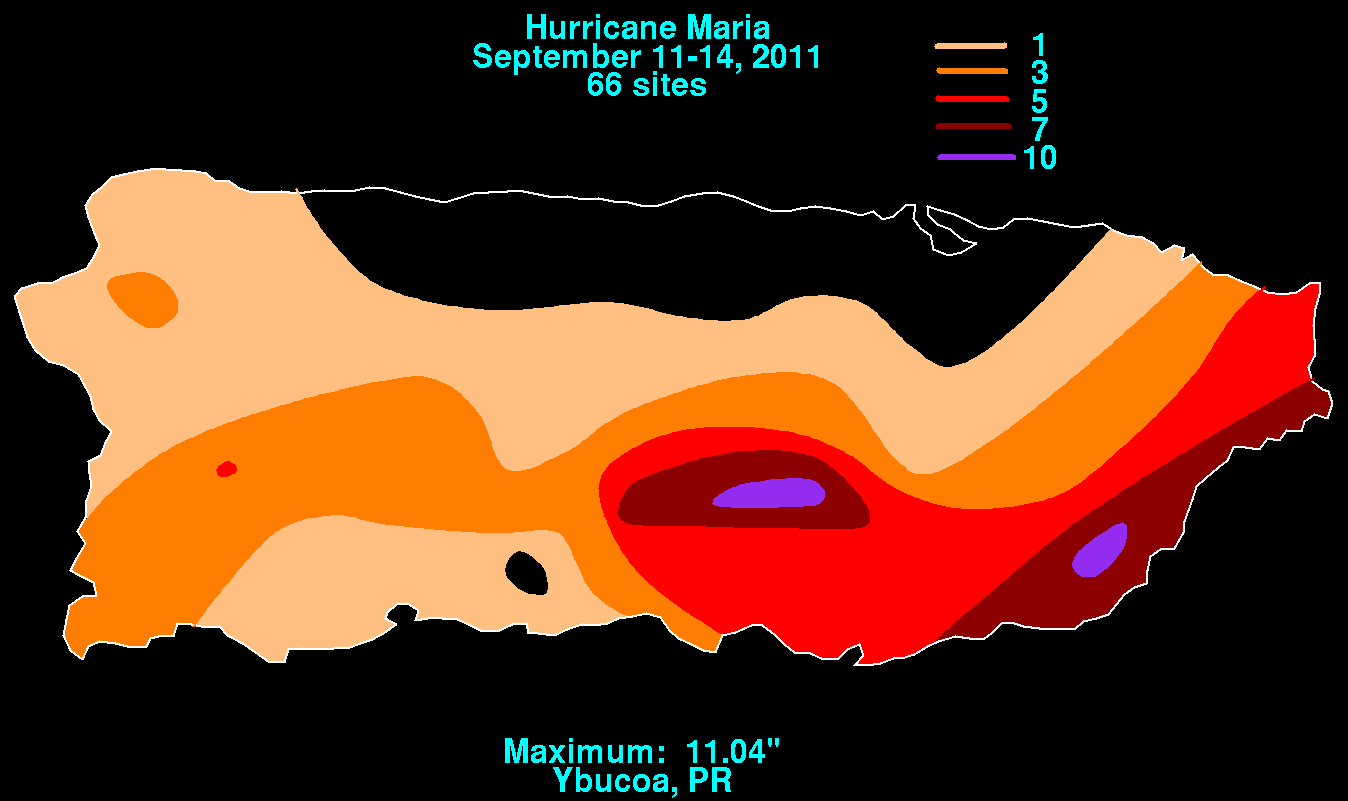
Rainfall caused by Maria in Puerto Rico

Before Maria's arrival, tropical storm watches were issued for most of the Lesser Antilles on September 8; the watches were upgraded to tropical storm warnings at 2230 UTC. On the following day, Puerto Rico and many of the U.S. Virgin Islands and British Virgin Islands were placed under a tropical storm watch. The watches and warnings for the islands were discontinued around 1500 UTC on September 10, after the strong thunderstorms diminished from Maria's center. The storm's effects on the island of Puerto Rico were primarily in the form of heavy rainfall. Flood waters near Patillas, Puerto Rico, destroyed several homes and bridges, causing $1.3 million (2011 USD) in damage. In the surrounding city of Yabucoa, Puerto Rico, heavy rainfall flooded and damaged around 150 homes. Many people were forced to relocate after rainfall and mud filled their homes. Near the city of Naguabo, Puerto Rico, the car of a 60-year-old woman was swept away by flood waters on a road. After becoming tangled in bushes, the woman was able to get out of her car and pulled to safety. Nearly a month after the storm, U.S. president Barack Obama announced that federal disaster aid would be available to the island due to Maria.

=== Bermuda ===
Following Maria's regeneration into a tropical cyclone, a tropical storm watch was issued for the island of Bermuda on September 13. The watch was upgraded to a warning later that day, and at 1200 UTC the following day, it was replaced by a hurricane watch. All watches and warnings for the island were discontinued by September 15. When Maria bypassed Bermuda on September 15, its outer bands briefly produced tropical storm-force winds across the island. At Commissioners Point, sustained winds reached 52 mph (84 km/h), with gusts as high as 69 mph (111 km/h), and winds of 36 mph (58 km/h) were reported at L.F. Wade International Airport at 1500 UTC on September 15.

=== Newfoundland ===
Satellite image of Hurricane Maria on September 16 as it made landfall in Newfoundland

In anticipation of Maria, Environment Canada declared a tropical storm watch for the coast of Newfoundland on September 15, which stretched from Arnolds Cove to Brigus South. Three hours later, it was upgraded to a hurricane watch, while a tropical storm watch was put into effect from Arnolds Cove to Jones Harbor. At 0600 UTC the following day, the watches and warnings were replaced by a hurricane warning, and areas between Brigus South and Charlottestown, Newfoundland were placed under a tropical storm warning. All tropical cyclone watches and warnings were discontinued at 2100 UTC on September 16. While becoming absorbed by a front on September 16, Maria made landfall on the southern tip of the Avalon Peninsula of Newfoundland, where winds of 64 mph (103 km/h) were recorded. Offshore, winds reached up to 77 mph (124 km/h). The capital city of St. John's experienced heavy rain, though not to the extent that had been forecast, as the storm moved through the peninsula faster than predicted.

== See also ==
- Other storms with the same name
- Hurricane Florence (2006)
- Hurricane Leslie (2012)
- List of Bermuda hurricanes
- List of Canada hurricanes
- List of Newfoundland hurricanes
