= List of Newfoundland hurricanes =

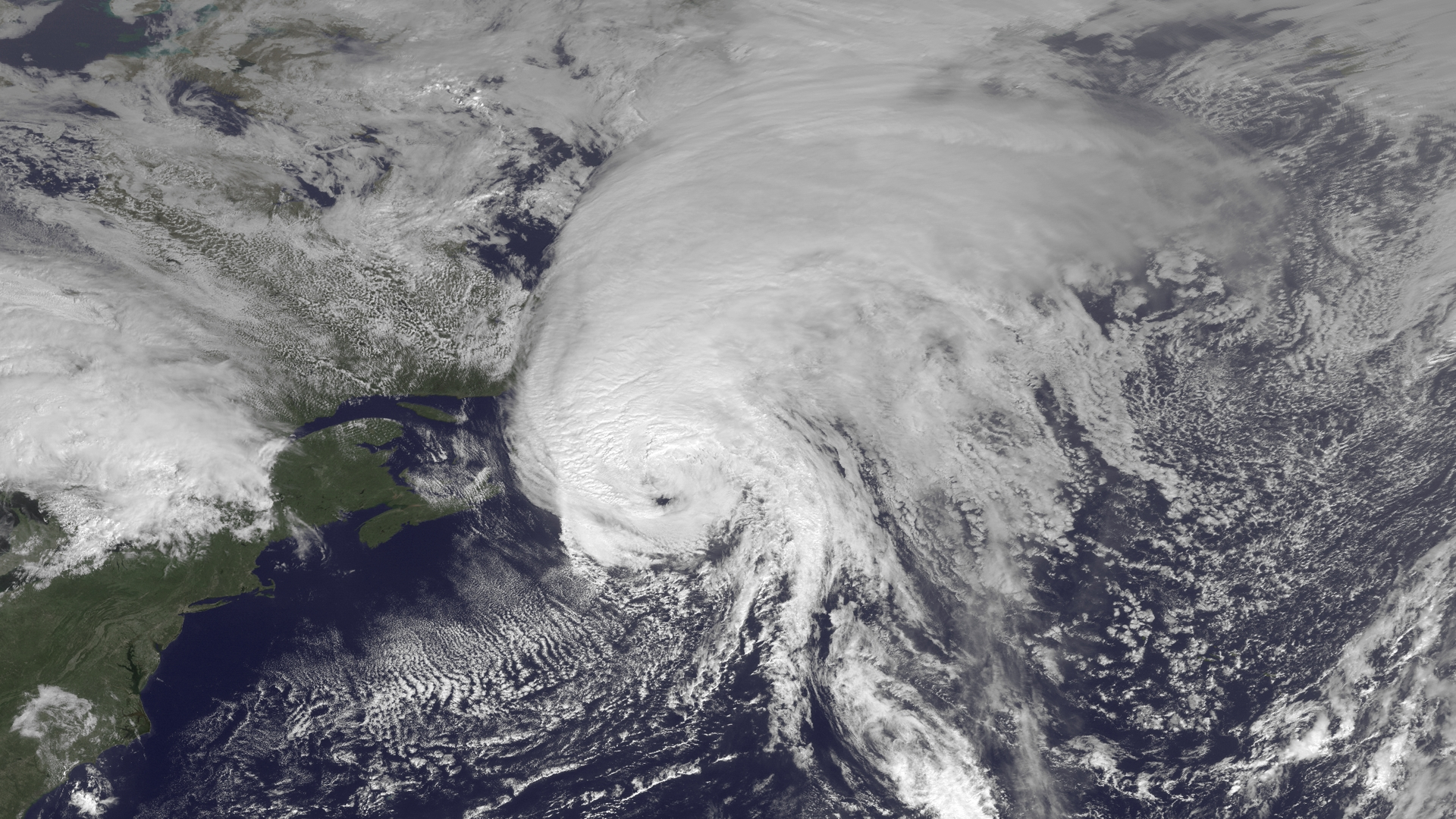
Satellite image of Hurricane Igor on September 21, 2010, as it made landfall on Newfoundland

Since official records began in 1851, There have been 25 recorded hurricanes that have made a direct landfall as a tropical or subtropical cyclone on the island of Newfoundland. Significant hurricanes such as the 1775 Newfoundland hurricane are also included on this list, even though they occurred prior to the start of official record-keeping.

Note: Hurricanes that made landfall in Newfoundland as a post-tropical cyclone (such as Hurricane Michael in 2000) are excluded from this list.

Storm	Classification at time of Newfoundland landfall	Date of Newfoundland landfall	Approximate landfall location	Region(s) affected	Impact on Newfoundland	Other areas affected	Track
1775 Newfoundland hurricane	Unknown	September 9, 1775	Unknown	Eastern coast	4,000-4,163+ fatalities at sea, making this the eighth-deadliest Atlantic hurricane on record.	North Carolina, Virginia	Unavailable
Unnamed	Tropical storm	August 27, 1851	St. Jacques-Coomb's Cove	Southern Coast	Unknown	The Caribbean, Southeastern United States	
Unnamed	Category 1 hurricane	September 23, 1866	Cape La Hune	Southern Coast	Some damage to telegraphs reported.	None	
1873 Nova Scotia Hurricane	Category 1 hurricane	August 26, 1873	Point Lance	Avalon Peninsula	Severe damage, estimated at $3.5 million (1873 USD). 100 deaths in Newfoundland, many of which were due to shipwrecks, and 900 homes were destroyed.	Nova Scotia (Note: This hurricane caused an additional 500 deaths off the coast of Nova Scotia due to shipwrecks.)	
Unnamed	Tropical storm	August 7, 1874	Hermitage-Sandyville	Southern Coast	Unknown	None	
Unnamed	Tropical storm	August 20, 1879	Channel-Port aux Basques	Southern Coast	Unknown	The Bahamas, East Coast of the United States (Note: This hurricane caused major damage and 46 deaths in the United States.)	
Unnamed	Tropical storm	September 10, 1880	St. Lawrence	Southern Coast	Unknown	None	
Unnamed	Tropical storm	September 2, 1884	Merasheen Island	Avalon Peninsula	Unknown	None	
Unnamed	Category 1 hurricane	August 24, 1886	Point May	Burin, Avalon Peninsula	Unknown	Nova Scotia	
Unnamed	Category 1 hurricane	September 8, 1891	Channel–Port aux Basques	Western Coast	A number of small vessels were destroyed.	Nova Scotia, especially Cape Breton	
Unnamed	Tropical storm	October 20, 1891	Coppett	Southern Coast	Unknown	Saint Croix, Virgin Islands	
Unnamed	Category 1 hurricane	August 18, 1893	Southern Harbour	Burin, Avalon Peninsula	Made landfall with maximum sustained winds of 145 km/h (90 mph).	None	
Unnamed	Tropical storm	October 7, 1893	Fortune, Newfoundland and Labrador	Southern Coast	Unknown	Yucatán Peninsula, Florida, The Bahamas (Note: This storm was responsible for an estimated 56 deaths.)	
1898 Georgia hurricane	Tropical depression	October 6, 1898	Connaigre Peninsula	Burin, Avalon Peninsula	Unknown	Southeastern United States (Note: This hurricane was responsible for $1.5 million (1898 USD) in damage, and 179 deaths.)	
Unnamed	Category 1 hurricane	September 15, 1899	Cape Race	Avalon Peninsula, entire island	Severe damage at fishing premises, sustained winds of 140 km/h (85 mph) at landfall. The schooners Angler, Daisy, and Lily May either capsized or were driven ashore, resulting in 16 deaths.	Lesser Antilles, Bermuda	
Unnamed	Tropical storm	September 18, 1908	South East Bight	Burin, Avalon Peninsula	Unknown	The Bahamas	
Unnamed	Tropical storm	September 9, 1943	McCallum	Southern Coast	Unknown	None	
Hurricane Alice	Tropical storm	July 6, 1973	Channel-Port aux Basques	Western Coast	Unknown	Bermuda	
Hurricane Evelyn	Category 1 hurricane	October 15, 1977	Channel-Port aux Basques	Western Coast	Light rain and tropical storm-force winds in areas.	Bermuda, Sable Island, Nova Scotia	
Subtropical Storm One	Subtropical storm	October 25, 1979	Rose Blanche-Harbour le Cou	Western Coast	Unknown	None	
Hurricane Dean	Tropical storm	August 8, 1989	Point May	Burin Peninsula, entire island	Winds of 80 km/h (50 mph), and moderate rainfall peaking at 2.7 in (68.58 mm).	Virgin Islands, Puerto Rico, Bermuda	
Hurricane Gustav	Category 1 hurricane	September 12, 2002	Burnt Islands	Southern Coast	Strong winds, gusts over 100 km/h (62 mph) were recorded.	North Carolina, Nova Scotia (especially Cape Breton Island)	
Hurricane Bill	Tropical storm	August 24, 2009	Point Enragée	Avalon Peninsula, entire island	A wind gust of 130 km/h (81 mph) was recorded in Cape Race. In St. John's, trees were blown down by the strong winds. Rainfall peaked at 2.75 in (70 mm) in Gander.	Bermuda, Nova Scotia (Note: This hurricane caused an estimated $10 million (2009 USD) in damage throughout Atlantic Canada.)	
Hurricane Igor	Category 1 hurricane	September 21, 2010	Cape Race	Avalon Peninsula, entire island	Extreme damage, the most destructive hurricane ever to strike Newfoundland, as well as the worst storm of tropical origin to hit Newfoundland since 1935. Third wettest hurricane on record, and maximum sustained winds at landfall of approximately 140 km/h (87 mph). Also caused $200 million in damage, and 1 fatality.	Cape Verde; Bermuda (minimal)	
Hurricane Maria	Tropical storm	September 16, 2011	Cape St. Mary's	Avalon Peninsula	Minor wind damage, wind gusts up to 102 km/h (63 mph).	Lesser Antilles	
Hurricane Larry	Category 1 hurricane	September 11, 2021	South East Bight	Avalon Peninsula	Maximum sustained winds at landfall of approximately 150 km/h (92 mph).	Bermuda (minimal)	

== See also ==
- List of Canada hurricanes
- List of Atlantic hurricanes
