= Hurricane Leslie (2012) =

Category 1 Atlantic hurricane in 2012

- Hurricane Leslie as a Category 1 storm on September 5

Meteorological history
- Formed: August 30, 2012
- Extratropical: September 11, 2012
- Dissipated: September 12, 2012

Category 1 hurricane
- 1-minute sustained (SSHWS/NWS)
- Highest winds: 80 mph (130 km/h)
- Lowest pressure: 968 mbar (hPa); 28.59 inHg

Overall effects
- Fatalities: None
- Damage: $10.1 million (2012 USD)
- Areas affected: Leeward Islands, Bermuda, Atlantic Canada
- IBTrACS
- Part of the 2012 Atlantic hurricane season

Hurricane Leslie was an Atlantic tropical cyclone that caused minor damage in Bermuda and Atlantic Canada in September 2012. The twelfth tropical cyclone of the annual hurricane season, Leslie developed from a tropical wave located nearly 1,500 miles (2,400 km) east of the Leeward Islands on August 30. About twelve hours later, it strengthened into Tropical Storm Leslie. Tracking steadily west-northwestward, it slowly intensified due to only marginally favorable conditions. By September 2, the storm curved north-northwestward while located north of the Leeward Islands. Thereafter, a blocking pattern over Atlantic Canada caused Leslie to drift for four days. Late on September 5, Leslie was upgraded to a Category 1 hurricane. However, due to its slow movement, the storm causing upwelling, which decreased sea surface temperatures (SST's), weakening Leslie back to a tropical storm on September 7.

The storm drifted until September 9, when it accelerated while passing east of Bermuda. Relatively strong winds on the island caused hundreds of power outages and knocked down tree branches, electrical poles, and other debris. Slight re-intensification took place, with Leslie becoming a hurricane again, before transitioning into an extratropical cyclone near Newfoundland on September 11. In Atlantic Canada, the storm brought heavy rainfall to both Nova Scotia and Newfoundland. In the latter, localized flooding occurred, especially in the western portions of the province. Also in Newfoundland, strong winds from Leslie ripped off roofs, destroyed trees, and left 45,000 homes without power. Additionally, a partially built house was destroyed and several incomplete homes were damaged in Pouch Cove. Overall, Hurricane Leslie caused $10.1 million (2012 USD) in damage and no fatalities.

== Meteorological history ==
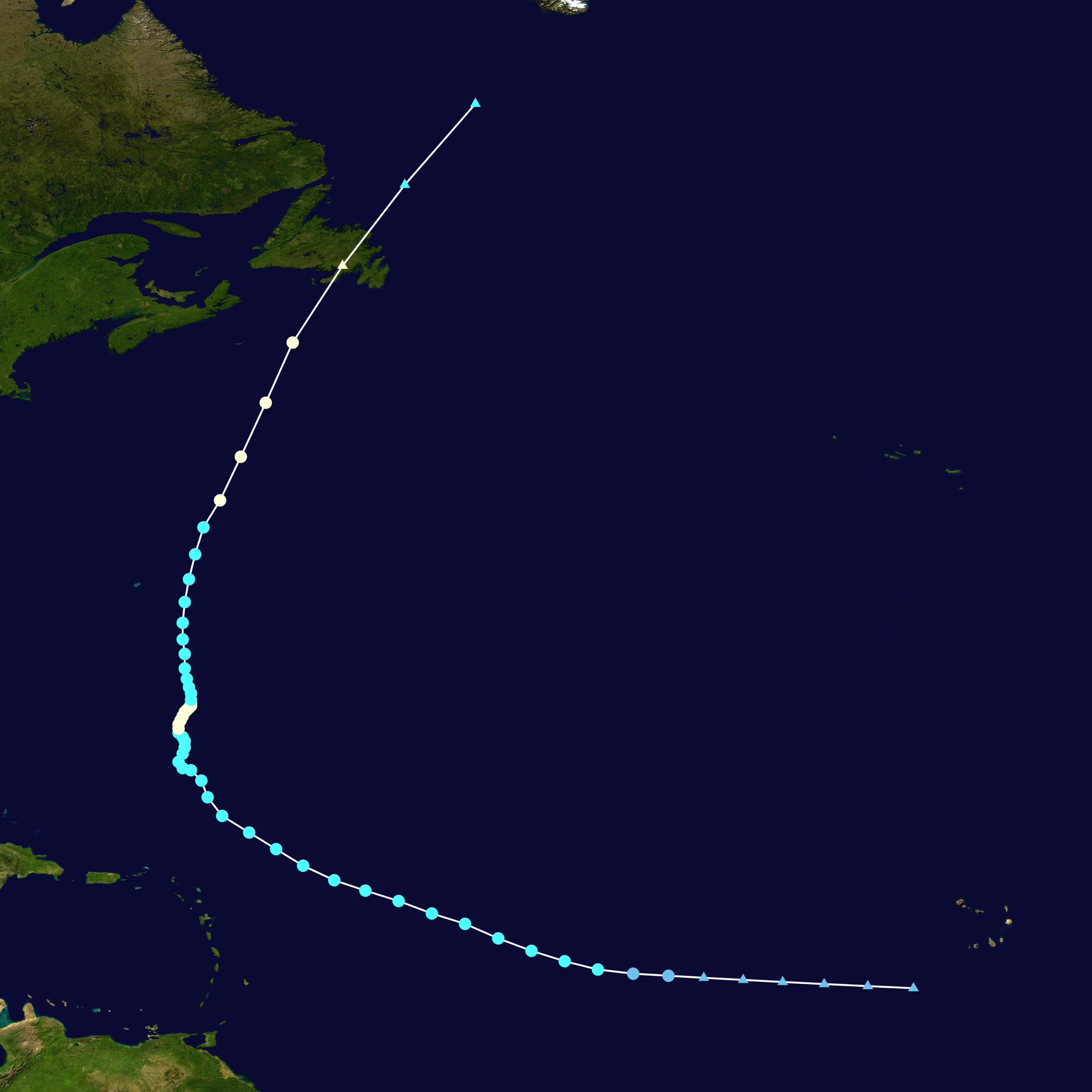
Map plotting the storm's track and intensity, according to the Saffir–Simpson scale Map key Saffir–Simpson scale Tropical depression (≤38 mph, ≤62 km/h) Tropical storm (39–73 mph, 63–118 km/h) Category 1 (74–95 mph, 119–153 km/h) Category 2 (96–110 mph, 154–177 km/h) Category 3 (111–129 mph, 178–208 km/h) Category 4 (130–156 mph, 209–251 km/h) Category 5 (≥157 mph, ≥252 km/h) Unknown Storm type Tropical cyclone Subtropical cyclone Extratropical cyclone, remnant low, tropical disturbance, or monsoon depression

A tropical wave, which was accompanied by a broad surface low pressure area, emerged into the Atlantic Ocean from the west coast of Africa late on August 26. Tracking generally westward, the system remained disorganized for the next several days. By August 29, the system became increasingly organized as showers and thunderstorms concentrated toward the center. Based on Dvorak satellite classifications and scatterometer surface wind data, it is estimated that Tropical Depression Twelve developed at 0000 UTC on August 30, while located about 1,495 miles (2,406 km) east-southeast of the northern Leeward Islands. Situated to the south of a subtropical ridge, the system tracked west-northwestward over warm sea surface temperatures. As a result, the depression strengthened into Tropical Storm Leslie by 1200 UTC on August 30.

After becoming a tropical storm on August 30, the subtropical ridge caused Leslie to turn west-northwestward. By the early on August 31, the storm featured well-define outflow in all directions and the center of circulation was close to the main area of convection. Intensity estimates around that time indicated sustained wind speeds of 70 mph (110 km/h). However, intensification halted later on August 31 as wind shear increased over the storm, causing convection to become displaced from the center. Early on September 1, an eye-like feature appeared on satellite imagery; however, there was uncertainty as to whether or not the feature was displaced from the low-level center. The storm became increasingly disorganized, with the circulation displaced from the main convective area several hours later.

Relentless wind shear caused Leslie to weaken to slightly to a 60 mph (95 km/h) tropical storm, despite sea surface temperatures (SSTs) exceeding 84 °F (29 °C). Early on September 3, the storm decelerated and curved northwestward, while approaching a weakness in Bermuda high pressure ridge. Eventually, Leslie turned to a more northerly motion. A blocking pattern over Atlantic Canada caused the storm to drift at forward speeds under 5 mph (8.0 km/h) for four days. Wind shear also decreased, allowing Leslie to re-organize and strengthen into a hurricane at 1200 UTC on September 5. Six hours later, Leslie attained its maximum sustained wind speed of 80 mph (130 km/h). However, the slow movement of the storm caused upwelling – a process by which warm SSTs are replaced with colder waters. As a result, Leslie slowly began to weaken and fell to tropical storm intensity by early on September 8. Despite weakening, the storm's circulation expanded to a radius of more than 1,150 miles (1,850 km); the wind field also expanded, with tropical storm force winds reaching about 175 miles (282 km) in diameter from the center.

By early on September 9, the blocking pattern diminished as a broad mid- to upper-level trough and associated cold front moved off the East Coast of the United States. As a result, Leslie accelerated north-northeastward. Later that day, the storm passed about 130 miles (210 km) east of Bermuda. After leaving the region of upwelled waters, Leslie began to re-strengthen and became a hurricane again at 1200 UTC on September 10. Early on the following day, the storm reached its minimum barometric pressure of 968 mbar (28.6 inHg). However, a combination of cold SSTs, strong wind shear, and merging with a cold front caused the storm to become an extratropical cyclone at 0900 UTC on September 11, while located about 85 miles (137 km) south of St. Lawrence, Newfoundland. Leslie was operationally considered a tropical cyclone when it made landfall on the Burin Peninsula of Newfoundland. The remnants of Leslie moved rapidly across Newfoundland and re-emerged into the Atlantic later on September 11. At 0600 UTC on the following day, the remnants of Leslie were absorbed into another larger extratropical storm over the Labrador Sea.

== Preparations and impact ==
=== Bermuda ===
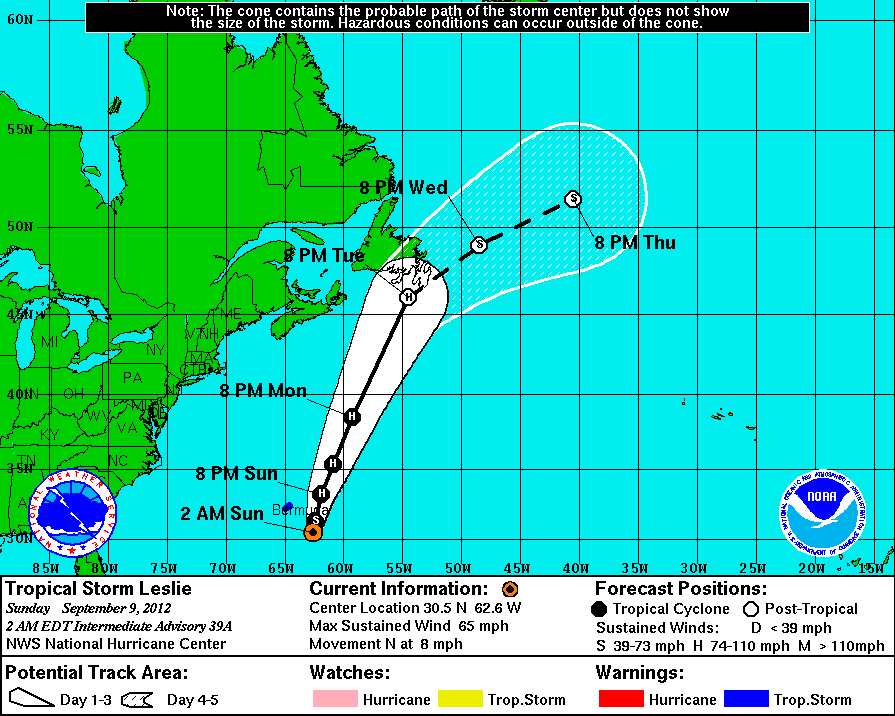
A 5-day forecast for Tropical Storm Leslie, issued on September 9, 2012

A few tropical cyclone warnings and watches were implemented in relation to Leslie. At 2100 UTC on September 6, a tropical storm watch was issued for Bermuda. The watch was upgraded to a tropical storm warning at 0900 UTC on September 8. By early on September 10, the warning was discontinued. On September 6, officials in Bermuda urged residents to "prepare for the worst". Schools prepared to close Friday as residents got ready for the approaching storm. "Leslie could be a historic storm for Bermuda as it is very large and forecast to intensify rapidly as it approaches," the Bermuda Emergency Measures Organization said. "The island could experience hurricane force winds for a sustained period of time, possibly up to two days."

However, the storm passed further east of Bermuda than initially predicted, causing only minor impact. Nonetheless, sustained winds of 39 mph (63 km/h) and a gust up to 54 mph (87 km/h) was reported in St. David's Island. At the same location, 3.15 inches (80 mm) of precipitation was recorded. Throughout Bermuda, scattered power outages affected hundreds of residents and tree branches and other debris fell on roads; at least one street pole was toppled in Hamilton.

=== Canada ===
Leslie as an extratropical cyclone after passing over Newfoundland on September 11.

At 0600 UTC on September 10, a tropical storm watch was issued from Indian Harbour southward to Stones Cove, Newfoundland, and from Fogo Island to Charlottetown. Simultaneously, a hurricane watch was put into effect from Stones Cove to Charlottetown. By 1500 UTC on September 10, the tropical storm watches were discontinued. Around that time, a tropical storm warning was implemented from Indian Harbour to Triton. By late on September 11, all watches and warnings were discontinued. As a precaution, the town of Badger declared a state of emergency.

While still a tropical cyclone, Leslie produced 2 to 4 inches (51 to 102 mm) of rain across much of Nova Scotia, peaking at 6.5 inches (170 mm) in Shubenacadie. The rainfall likely contributed to the ongoing flooding in some areas of Nova Scotia. Similarly, 2 to 4 inches (51 to 102 mm) of precipitation was reported throughout much of Newfoundland, with a peak total of 4.25 inches (108 mm) in Cow Head. Localized flooding left some roads and bridges impassable and briefly isolated the Port au Port Peninsula from the mainland of Newfoundland. Due to winds up to 85 mph (137 km/h), Leslie ripped off roofs, destroyed trees, and left 45,000 homes without power, particularly on the Avalon Peninsula, in the southeast portion of Newfoundland. In Pouch Cove on the Avalon Peninsula, the storm destroyed a partially built house and damaged incomplete homes in the Pleasantville neighborhood of St. John's. Within the latter, several streets were closed, as crews cleaned up scattered debris. A portion of Memorial University of Newfoundland's campus was closed after glass littered a pedestrian walk. Later, the remnants of Leslie brought rainfall to Nunavut, bring 1.4 inches (36 mm) of precipitation to Iqaluit during a three-day period. Damage in Atlantic Canada reached 10 million CAD ($10.1 million USD).

=== Elsewhere ===
While passing to north of the Lesser Antilles, Leslie generated rough surf on various Leeward Islands, the Virgin Islands, and Puerto Rico. Leslie, combined with the remnants of Hurricane Isaac, also produced rip currents along the east coast of Florida, mainly from Nassau County south to Martin County. Additionally, the storm also brought rip currents to coastal Delaware and New Jersey between September 5 and September 6.

== See also ==
- Other storms of the same name
- List of Bermuda hurricanes
- Hurricane Florence (2006)
- Hurricane Maria (2011)
