= Ashdale, Nova Scotia =

Community in Nova Scotia, Canada

Coordinates: 45°31′11.35″N 62°1′54.83″W

Ashdale in Nova Scotia

Ashdale is a small community in the Canadian province of Nova Scotia, located in Antigonish County. It is on Nova Scotia Trunk 7, approximately 13 km south of Antigonish, at an elevation around 100m. It was formerly known as Collegeville and an Environment Canada weather station in the community retains the name Collegeville. The Collegeville post office was opened on June 1, 1887, and closed February 29, 1932.
