= Güira de Melena Municipal Museum =

Museum in Cuba

- Museo Municipal de Güira de Melena
- Established: 11 December 1980
- Location: Güira de Melena, Cuba

Güira de Melena Municipal Museum is a museum located in the 82nd street in Güira de Melena, Cuba. It was established as a museum on 11 December 1980.

The museum holds collections on history, weaponry and decorative arts.

== See also ==
- List of museums in Cuba
