= Güira de Melena =

- Municipality
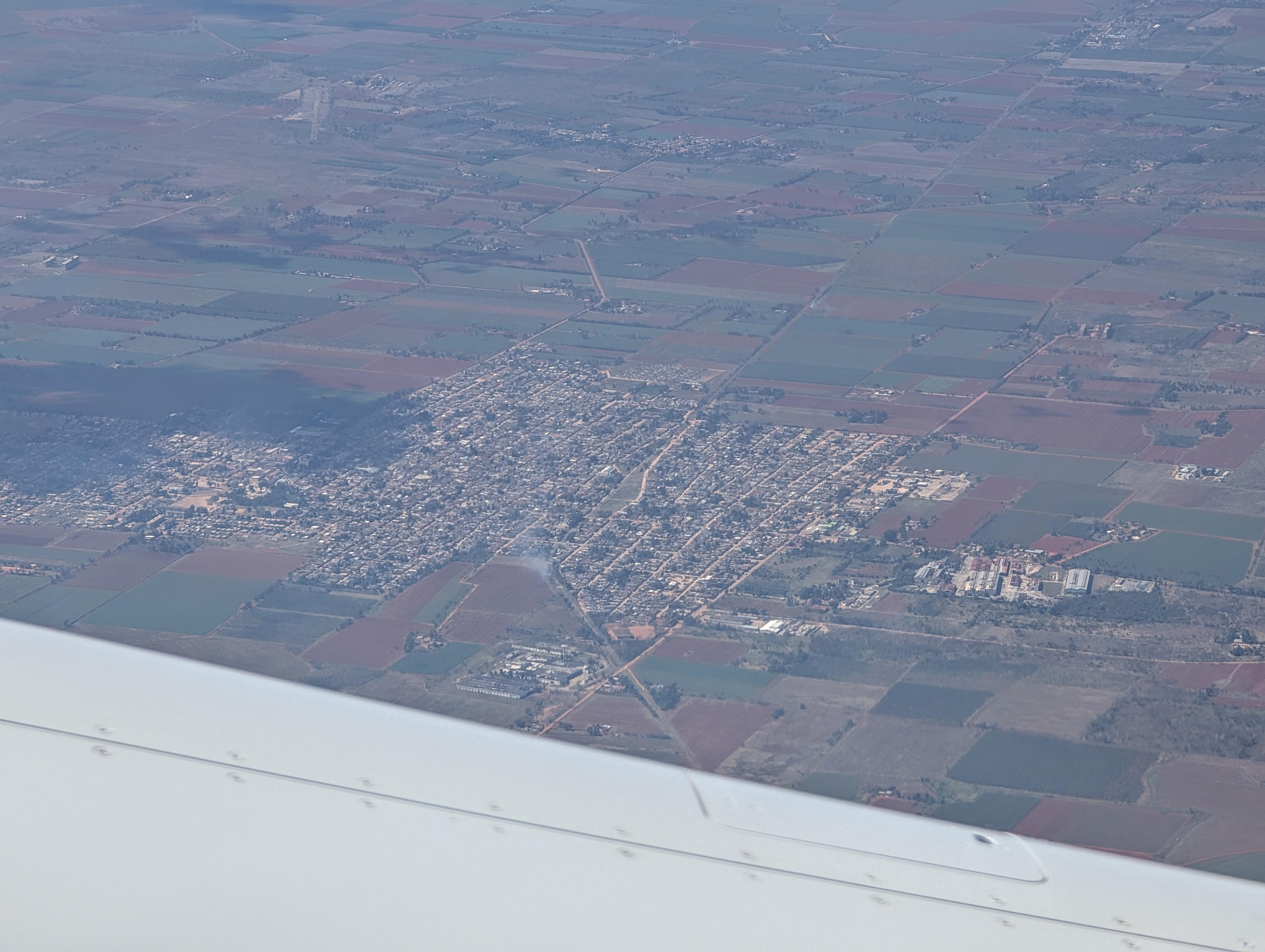
- Güira de Melena as seen from a plane

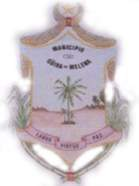
- Coat of arms

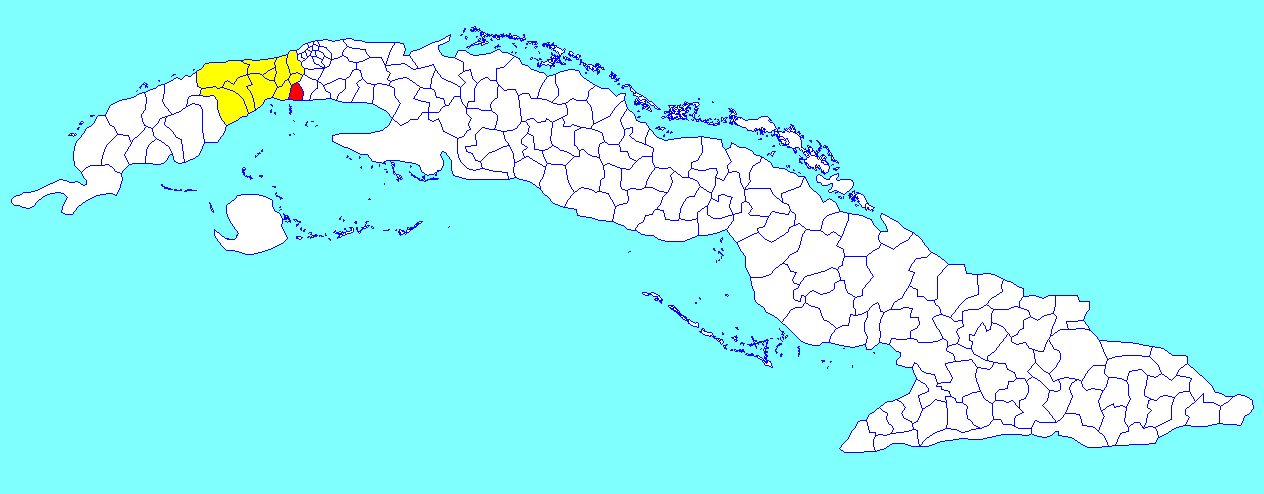
- Güira de Melena municipality (red) within Artemisa Province (yellow) and Cuba
- Coordinates: 22°48′7″N 82°30′17″W
- Country: Cuba
- Province: Artemisa
- Founded: 1779

Area
  - Total: 178 km^{2} (69 sq mi)
- Elevation: 20 m (66 ft)

Population (2022)
  - Total: 40,219
  - Density: 226/km^{2} (585/sq mi)
- Time zone: UTC-5 (EST)
- Area code: +53-7
- Climate: Aw

Güira de Melena is a municipality and town in the Artemisa Province since January 1, 2011; before it was part of the Havana province of Cuba. It is located on the southern shore of the island, bordering the Bay of Batabanó and on the west part of Cuba. It was founded in 1779.

== Geography ==
The town is south of San Antonio de los Baños, west of Quivican and east of Alquízar.

The municipality is divided into the barrios of Gabriel, Cajio, Tumbadero, La Cachimba, Penalver, Pulguero, Guerrilla, Pekin and Corea.

The municipality is divided into 6 consejos populares (i.e. "popular councils"): Vivian Alonso, Niceto Pérez, Ubaldo Díaz, Cajio, Gabriel, and Junco.

== Economy ==
The principal economic activities include agriculture, especially tobacco; the city has cigar factories. Other agricultural products are potatoes, bananas, pineapples and other tropical fruits, and dairy products.

== Demographics ==
In 2022, the municipality of Güira de Melena had a population of 40,219. With a total area of 178 km^{2} (69 sq mi), it has a population density of 230/km^{2} (600/sq mi).

== Notable residents ==
- Lizandra Góngora, human rights activist.

== See also ==
- Municipalities of Cuba
- List of cities in Cuba
- Güira de Melena Municipal Museum
