= CSN International translators =

CSN International is relayed by numerous low-powered translators nationwide. As a noncommercial educational station, CSN International flagship KAWZ is allowed to place translators anywhere in the United States, regardless of distance from its parent station's coverage area.

== Alabama ==
Call sign	Frequency	City of license	FID	FCC info
W273AJ	102.5 FM	Athens, AL	138669	LMS
W213BY	90.5 FM	Huntsville, AL	92936	LMS
W214BN	90.7 FM	Malbis, AL	93156	LMS

== Alaska ==
Call sign	Frequency	City of license	FID	FCC info
K216DG	91.1 FM	Ketchikan, AK	77115	LMS
K216DF	91.1 FM	Kodiak, AK	77070	LMS
K220FY	91.9 FM	Sitka, AK	77127	LMS

== Arizona ==
Call sign	Frequency	City of license	FID	FCC info
K210DY	89.9 FM	Black Canyon City, AZ	93402	LMS
K220GI	91.9 FM	Camp Verde, AZ	86642	LMS
K281BO	104.1 FM	Clifton, AZ	92863	LMS
K206BT	89.1 FM	Fredonia, AZ	1666	LMS
K217FX	91.3 FM	Groom Creek, AZ	87699	LMS
K214EL	90.7 FM	Holbrook, AZ	78529	LMS
K219KQ	91.7 FM	Payson, AZ	91357	LMS
K271BH	102.1 FM	Pinetop, AZ	8429	LMS
K206DH	89.1 FM	Winslow, AZ	88571	LMS
K211DD	90.1 FM	Yuma, AZ	76687	LMS

== Arkansas ==
Call sign	Frequency	City of license	FID	FCC info
K295BS	106.9 FM	Bentonville, AR	92678	LMS
K213EU	90.5 FM	Fayetteville, AR	88124	LMS
K258CE	99.5 FM	Fort Smith, AR	157551	LMS
K218DE	91.5 FM	Jonesboro, AR	92689	LMS
K203BO	88.5 FM	Mena, AR	4239	LMS
K204DN	88.7 FM	Paragould, AR	92655	LMS
K207CW	89.3 FM	Paris, AR	92540	LMS
K204DO	88.7 FM	Pine Bluff, AR	92518	LMS

== California ==
Call sign	Frequency	City of license	FID	FCC info
K214ED	90.7 FM	Bakersfield, CA	91104	LMS
K212BD	90.3 FM	Barstow, CA	8427	LMS
K251BI	98.1 FM	Belleview, Humboldt County, California	151108	LMS
K209CY	89.7 FM	Blythe, CA	90667	LMS
K220GJ	91.9 FM	Borrego Springs, CA	87499	LMS
K207ER	89.3 FM	Burney, CA	91484	LMS
K220JV	91.9 FM	Byron, CA	71991	LMS
K209GD	89.7 FM	Chico, CA	92826	LMS
K212DJ	90.3 FM	Clearlake, CA	92163	LMS
K215FX	90.9 FM	Coalinga, CA	78540	LMS
K272AY	102.3 FM	Crescent City, CA	71987	LMS
K237GK	95.3 FM	Dorris, CA	56806	LMS
K229AF	93.7 FM	Eureka, CA	71997	LMS
K219LS	91.7 FM	Garberville, CA	72005	LMS
K272DX	102.3 FM	Grass Valley, CA	142323	LMS
K270AF	101.9 FM	Grover Beach, CA	83335	LMS
K218FK	91.5 FM	Happy Camp, CA	91003	LMS
K221EV	92.1 FM	Hayfork, CA	138679	LMS
K205DT	88.9 FM	Indio, CA	94146	LMS
K279BV	103.7 FM	Johnstonville, CA	92958	LMS
K207DJ	89.3 FM	Lake Isabella, CA	106681	LMS
K207CT	89.3 FM	Lakehead, CA	91286	LMS
K275BO	102.9 FM	Las Cruces, CA	72001	LMS
K216AX	91.1 FM	Laurel, CA	71971	LMS
K215EQ	90.9 FM	Lompoc, CA	71998	LMS
K201FW	88.1 FM	Los Gatos, CA	93377	LMS
K220IA	91.9 FM	Maple Creek, CA	106581	LMS
K214CT	90.7 FM	Mariposa, CA	84432	LMS

Call sign	Frequency	City of license	FID	FCC info
K209GF	89.7 FM	Marysville, CA	142345	LMS
K267AJ	101.3 FM	Mt. Shasta, CA	91890	LMS
K276EF	103.1 FM	Muscoy, CA	89084	LMS
K201IH	88.1 FM	Napa, CA	91413	LMS
K218EU	91.5 FM	North San Juan, CA	92260	LMS
K254BF	98.7 FM	Oroville, CA	92350	LMS
K289CW	105.7 FM	Palm Springs, CA	72006	LMS
K288BO	105.5 FM	Paso Robles, CA	72012	LMS
K210EV	89.9 FM	Pine Grove, CA	91412	LMS
K216FA	91.1 FM	Quartz Hill, CA	93062	LMS
K212DF	90.3 FM	Red Bluff, CA	91892	LMS
K220IR	91.9 FM	Redding, CA	77019	LMS
K218DU	91.5 FM	Ridgecrest, CA	8434	LMS
K201IS	88.1 FM	Rincon, CA	91871	LMS
K238AY	95.5 FM	Rio Linda, CA	142325	LMS
K252CK	98.3 FM	Salinas, CA	71995	LMS
K249AQ	97.7 FM	San Ardo, CA	71986	LMS
K214ET	90.7 FM	San Luis Obispo, CA	77025	LMS
K285EW	104.9 FM	San Luis Obispo, CA	72004	LMS
K218CP	91.5 FM	Santa Barbara, CA	90737	LMS
K216FQ	91.1 FM	Santa Maria, CA	71984	LMS
K271CJ	102.1 FM	Scotia, CA	72007	LMS
K249EW	97.7 FM	Shasta, CA	56805	LMS
K298AF	107.5 FM	Shasta, CA	72000	LMS
K240AK	95.9 FM	Soledad, CA	71978	LMS
K234AL	94.7 FM	Sonora, CA	151436	LMS
K240CD	95.9 FM	Soquel, CA	71988	LMS
K207CP	89.3 FM	South Lake Tahoe, CA	89733	LMS
K259AU	99.7 FM	Stockton, CA	139416	LMS
K205EK	88.9 FM	Susanville, CA	8422	LMS

Call sign	Frequency	City of license	FID	FCC info
K206DF	89.1 FM	Talmage, CA	91893	LMS
K254AR	98.7 FM	Truckee, CA	88576	LMS
K212EK	90.3 FM	Victorville, CA	76689	LMS
K212DK	90.3 FM	Westwood, CA	92870	LMS
K214EE	90.7 FM	Yankee Hill, CA	91850	LMS
K204DM	88.7 FM	Yreka, CA	92613	LMS
K216CX	91.1 FM	Yucca Valley, CA	8425	LMS

== Colorado ==
Call sign	Frequency	City of license	FID	FCC info
K201FK	88.1 FM	Burlington, CO	92415	LMS
K208FS	89.5 FM	Fort Morgan, CO	92436	LMS
K205CK	88.9 FM	Grand Junction, CO	8419	LMS
K211EI	90.1 FM	Lamar, CO	92416	LMS
K220IK	91.9 FM	Limon, CO	92414	LMS
K213CK	90.5 FM	Montrose, CO	88127	LMS
K201IP	88.1 FM	Sterling, CO	92423	LMS
K220IJ	91.9 FM	Yuma, CO	92420	LMS

== Florida ==
Call sign	Frequency	City of license	FID	FCC info
W229AH	93.7 FM	Eastport, FL	139248	LMS
W203AY	88.5 FM	Golden Lakes, FL	91393	LMS
W204BW	88.7 FM	Gulf Breeze, FL	8424	LMS
W217BL	91.3 FM	Jacksonville, FL	93157	LMS
W204CD	88.7 FM	Key West, FL	78766	LMS
W204CD	88.7 FM	Panama City, FL	92766	LMS
W283AW	104.5 FM	Tallahassee, FL	140901	LMS

== Georgia ==
Call sign	Frequency	City of license	FID	FCC info
W203BO	88.5 FM	Athens, GA	77055	LMS
W207CH	89.3 FM	Blue Ridge, GA	92864	LMS
W219DU	91.7 FM	Brunswick, GA	92893	LMS
W201CC	88.1 FM	Buford, GA	91293	LMS
W220EH	91.9 FM	Gainesville, GA	93847	LMS
W211CG	90.1 FM	Macon, GA	78537	LMS
W245AN	96.9 FM	Milledgeville, GA	156896	LMS
W206AT	89.1 FM	Savannah, GA	76657	LMS
W213BE	90.5 FM	Snellville, GA	93159	LMS
W298BL	107.5 FM	Thomasville, GA	93658	LMS
W203BY	88.5 FM	Warner Robins, GA	77535	LMS
W201DM	88.1 FM	Woodstock, GA	122159	LMS

== Hawaii ==
Call sign	Frequency	City of license	FID	FCC info
K208GK	89.5 FM	Hilo, HI	92769	LMS
K216FI	91.1 FM	Honolulu, HI	77051	LMS
K215EH	90.9 FM	Kailua, HI	89650	LMS
K217GG	91.3 FM	Kalaoa, HI	92797	LMS
K217GE	91.3 FM	Kihei, HI	91593	LMS
K205EB	88.9 FM	Lanai, HI	122260	LMS

== Idaho ==
Call sign	Frequency	City of license	FID	FCC info
K206CX	89.1 FM	Ammon, ID	122263	LMS
K239AC	95.7 FM	Boise, ID	81218	LMS
K266BJ	101.1 FM	Burley, ID	122265	LMS
K224CV	92.7 FM	Cascade, ID	139387	LMS
K217DR	91.3 FM	Grangeville, ID	93680	LMS
K258BV	99.5 FM	Ketchum/Hailey, ID	121882	LMS
K256AN	99.1 FM	McCall, ID	139380	LMS
K278AR	103.5 FM	Moscow, ID	143030	LMS
K206CY	89.1 FM	Pocatello, ID	122262	LMS
K212FQ	90.3 FM	Salmon, ID	153118	LMS
K212EY	90.3 FM	Sandpoint, ID	85364	LMS

== Illinois ==
Call sign	Frequency	City of license	FID	FCC info
W213BI	90.5 FM	Decatur, IL	77110	LMS
K203EF	88.5 FM	Mount Vernon, IL	92538	LMS

== Indiana ==
Call sign	Frequency	City of license	FID	FCC info
W216BW	91.1 FM	Hamburg, IN	93906	LMS
W211CH	90.1 FM	Terre Haute, IN	86934	LMS
W209CL	89.7 FM	Washington, IN	83669	LMS

== Iowa ==
Call sign	Frequency	City of license	FID	FCC info
K208DS	89.5 FM	Cherokee, IA	92825	LMS
K206DW	89.1 FM	Creston, IA	92602	LMS
K215FN	90.9 FM	Des Moines, IA	121782	LMS
K218CE	91.5 FM	Marshalltown, IA	76660	LMS

== Kansas ==
Call sign	Frequency	City of license	FID	FCC info
K207EI	89.3 FM	Emporia, KS	78541	LMS
K203EU	88.5 FM	Hutchinson, KS	77282	LMS
K208EK	89.5 FM	Parsons, KS	92264	LMS
K208FE	89.5 FM	Topeka, KS	79216	LMS
K204DQ	88.7 FM	Wichita, KS	93158	LMS

== Kentucky ==
Call sign	Frequency	City of license	FID	FCC info
W207CG	89.3 FM	Bowling Green, KY	140701	LMS
W213CB	90.5 FM	Covington, KY	93954	LMS
W218CM	91.5 FM	Glasgow, KY	92761	LMS
W274AM	102.7 FM	Louisville, KY	157478	LMS
W213BP	90.5 FM	South Portsmouth, KY	89379	LMS
W204CP	88.7 FM	Westport, KY	106487	LMS

== Louisiana ==
Call sign	Frequency	City of license	FID	FCC info
K279AL	103.7 FM	Baton Rouge, LA	150752	LMS
K275AL	102.9 FM	Denham Springs, LA	150758	LMS
K220EU	91.9 FM	Erwinville, LA	21099	LMS
K201FO	88.1 FM	Jennings, LA	92353	LMS
K237EW	95.3 FM	Port Allen, LA	150763	LMS

== Maryland ==
Call sign	Frequency	City of license	FID	FCC info
W206AY	89.1 FM	Fruitland, MD	91849	LMS

== Michigan ==
Call sign	Frequency	City of license	FID	FCC info
W201CF	88.1 FM	Baldwin, MI	91284	LMS
W216BX	91.1 FM	Benton Harbor, MI	92626	LMS
W205CX	88.9 FM	Caro, MI	91309	LMS
W214AY	90.7 FM	Walker, MI	89602	LMS

== Minnesota ==
Call sign	Frequency	City of license	FID	FCC info
K204ES	88.7 FM	Brainerd, MN	92001	LMS
K214FP	90.7 FM	Fergus Falls, MN	42935	LMS
K213FA	90.5 FM	Grand Rapids, MN	93953	LMS

== Mississippi ==
Call sign	Frequency	City of license	FID	FCC info
W215BE	90.9 FM	D'Iberville/Biloxi, MS	92421	LMS
W218BV	91.5 FM	Waynesboro, MS	77975	LMS

== Missouri ==
Call sign	Frequency	City of license	FID	FCC info
K256BQ	99.1 FM	Branson, MO	77116	LMS
K216GK	91.1 FM	Brookfield, MO	1619	LMS
K212FW	90.3 FM	Joplin, MO	8437	LMS
K218BU	91.5 FM	Memphis, MO	1658	LMS
K217GC	91.3 FM	Nevada, MO	92311	LMS
K204DT	88.7 FM	Rogersville, MO	93707	LMS
K220HT	91.9 FM	St. Louis, MO	93218	LMS

== Montana ==
Call sign	Frequency	City of license	FID	FCC info
K217EM	91.3 FM	Billings, MT	93793	LMS
K296EM	107.1 FM	Billings, MT	71835	LMS
K268AS	101.5 FM	Bozeman, MT	141013	LMS
K201FG	88.1 FM	Culbertson, MT	92314	LMS
K218DN	91.5 FM	Gallatin Gateway, MT	88253	LMS
K215CW	90.9 FM	Glendive, MT	92312	LMS
K295CG	106.9 FM	Great Falls, MT	8435	LMS
K201IN	88.1 FM	Hamilton, MT	78524	LMS
K216GJ	91.1 FM	Helena, MT	78527	LMS
K201EY	88.1 FM	Kalispell, MT	91808	LMS
K266BK	101.1 FM	Missoula, MT	91845	LMS
K266BI	101.1 FM	Polson, MT	93878	LMS
K261FH	100.1 FM	Whitefish, MT	93836	LMS

== Nebraska ==
Call sign	Frequency	City of license	FID	FCC info
K220HX	91.9 FM	Franklin, NE	93753	LMS
K217FM	91.3 FM	Norfolk, NE	92763	LMS
K220FK	91.9 FM	Scottsbluff, NE	76658	LMS

== Nevada ==
Call sign	Frequency	City of license	FID	FCC info
K218EV	91.5 FM	Battle Mountain, NV	93262	LMS
K259AK	99.7 FM	Carson City, NV	86398	LMS
K220HG	91.9 FM	Elko, NV	92319	LMS
K264CG	100.7 FM	Fernley, NV	142426	LMS
K211DC	90.1 FM	Las Vegas, NV	78969	LMS
K204FR	88.7 FM	Lovelock, NV	92131	LMS
K277BW	103.3 FM	Reno, NV	82391	LMS
K217DN	91.3 FM	Riepetown/Ely, NV	93087	LMS
K215DX	90.9 FM	Round Mountain, NV	91591	LMS
K207CP	89.3 FM	South Lake Tahoe, CA	89733	LMS
K200AA	87.9 FM	Sun Valley, NV	83363	LMS
K208ET	89.5 FM	Tonopah, NV	93152	LMS
K223AM	92.5 FM	Wells, NV	106680	LMS
K201FF	88.1 FM	Winnemucca, NV	92129	LMS

The Sun Valley translator is unusual in that translators are not normally allowed on 87.9 MHz. The translator was originally licensed for 88.1 MHz, but was allowed to move to 87.9 MHz to avoid interfering with 88.3 in Sparks, Nevada.

== New Jersey ==
Call sign	Frequency	City of license	FID	FCC info
W215CE	90.9 FM	Cape May, NJ	77342	LMS

== New Mexico ==
Call sign	Frequency	City of license	FID	FCC info
K203EB	88.5 FM	Farmington, NM	78619	LMS
K215EG	90.9 FM	Gallup, NM	85731	LMS
K212GF	90.3 FM	Las Cruces, NM	79364	LMS
K206EG	89.1 FM	Portales, NM	77537	LMS
K213EA	90.5 FM	Roswell, NM	88509	LMS

== New York ==
Call sign	Frequency	City of license	FID	FCC info
W285DI	104.9 FM	Binghamton, NY	2869	LMS
W203AW	88.5 FM	Fredonia, NY	90461	LMS
W214AR	90.7 FM	Oswego, NY	78019	LMS
W296DI	107.1 FM	Seneca Falls, NY	138690	LMS

== North Carolina ==
Call sign	Frequency	City of license	FID	FCC info
W219DX	91.7 FM	Asheville, NC	90071	LMS
W244CD	96.7 FM	Browns Summit, NC	88246	LMS
W224BC	92.7 FM	Burlington, NC	138589	LMS
W291AN	106.1 FM	Eden, NC	87017	LMS
W219DN	91.7 FM	Elizabeth City, NC	122820	LMS
W224CP	92.7 FM	High Point, NC	138593	LMS
W205BY	88.9 FM	Lexington, NC	88320	LMS
W219BY	91.7 FM	Mount Olive, NC	88245	LMS
W236AL	95.1 FM	Summerfield, NC	138590	LMS
W228BE	93.5 FM	Winston-Salem, NC	138597	LMS

== North Dakota ==
Call sign	Frequency	City of license	FID	FCC info
K201FN	88.1 FM	Dickinson, ND	92539	LMS
K201FJ	88.1 FM	Williston, ND	92315	LMS

== Ohio ==
Call sign	Frequency	City of license	FID	FCC info
W207CD	89.3 FM	Hamler, OH	8423	LMS
W258BT	99.5 FM	Perrysburg, OH	92941	LMS

== Oklahoma ==
Call sign	Frequency	City of license	FID	FCC info
K201FP	88.1 FM	Arapaho, OK	92559	LMS
K218ER	91.5 FM	Berlin, OK	92798	LMS
K272EY	102.3 FM	Chickasha, OK	92542	LMS
K214EM	90.7 FM	Durant, OK	92762	LMS
K266BG	101.1 FM	Edmond, OK	93289	LMS
K208CG	89.5 FM	Oklahoma City, OK	76176	LMS
K216HA	91.1 FM	Wister, OK	92759	LMS
K204EQ	88.7 FM	Woodward, OK	92597	LMS

== Oregon ==
Call sign	Frequency	City of license	FID	FCC info
K247AQ	97.3 FM	Ashland, OR	139138	LMS
K203DY	88.5 FM	Baker City, OR	88518	LMS
K295DB	106.9 FM	Bend, OR	89202	LMS
K201DV	88.1 FM	Brookings, OR	77718	LMS
K202DT	88.3 FM	Canyonville, OR	91875	LMS
K218DP	91.5 FM	Cave Junction, OR	90439	LMS
K258AR	99.5 FM	Cloverdale, OR	139549	LMS
K216EH	91.1 FM	Colton, OR	91971	LMS
K271AR	102.1 FM	Coos Bay, OR	143727	LMS
K212AK	90.3 FM	Corvallis, OR	72002	LMS
K273AJ	102.5 FM	Elwood, OR	91973	LMS
K207DQ	89.3 FM	Florence, OR	93077	LMS
K205DM	88.9 FM	Glide, OR	92498	LMS
K202EH	88.3 FM	Gold Beach, OR	90256	LMS
K213CF	90.5 FM	Grants Pass, OR	82789	LMS
K246BB	97.1 FM	Keno, OR	139146	LMS
K220II	91.9 FM	Lakeview, OR	122157	LMS
K296BS	107.1 FM	Medford, OR	71972	LMS
K276EO	103.1 FM	Merlin, OR	139145	LMS
K201DH	88.1 FM	Pendleton, OR	77128	LMS
K220IN	91.9 FM	Portland, OR	121763	LMS
K288FT	105.5 FM	Portland, OR	138942	LMS
K205CJ	88.9 FM	Prairie City, OR	37440	LMS
K238AL	95.5 FM	Reedsport, OR	139540	LMS
K209GJ	89.7 FM	Roseburg, OR	77106	LMS
K280BK	103.9 FM	Selma, OR	71989	LMS
K206EH	89.1 FM	Sprague River, OR	122005	LMS
K205EG	88.9 FM	The Dalles, OR	91527	LMS

== Pennsylvania ==
Call sign	Frequency	City of license	FID	FCC info
W209CS	89.7 FM	Erie, PA	89658	LMS
W220BX	91.9 FM	York, PA	88126	LMS

== South Carolina ==
Call sign	Frequency	City of license	FID	FCC info
W218BX	91.5 FM	Bluffton, SC	89261	LMS
W212CN	90.3 FM	Charleston, SC	89524	LMS
W207BQ	89.3 FM	Columbia, SC	91844	LMS
W203BG	88.5 FM	Conway, SC	12403	LMS
W206AR	89.1 FM	Florence, SC	82785	LMS
W214CE	90.7 FM	Greenville, SC	91287	LMS
W204AL	88.7 FM	Kingstree, SC	12405	LMS
W211BV	90.1 FM	Lexington, SC	141234	LMS
W208BA	89.5 FM	Myrtle Beach, SC	12407	LMS
W246AS	97.1 FM	Olympia, SC	141241	LMS
W225AJ	92.9 FM	Johns Island, SC	138636	LMS

== South Dakota ==
Call sign	Frequency	City of license	FID	FCC info
K209FR	89.7 FM	Aberdeen, SD	92651	LMS
K260BT	99.9 FM	Rapid City, SD	154792	LMS

== Tennessee ==
Call sign	Frequency	City of license	FID	FCC info
W214BQ	90.7 FM	Brentwood, TN	93256	LMS
W203AZ	88.5 FM	Chattanooga, TN	92786	LMS
W206BO	89.1 FM	Dickson, TN	122915	LMS
W287DO	105.3 FM	Lebanon, TN	138655	LMS
W288CI	105.5 FM	Nashville, TN	141076	LMS
W220CC	91.9 FM	New Johnsonville, TN	89016	LMS

== Texas ==
Call sign	Frequency	City of license	FID	FCC info
K211FZ	90.1 FM	Austin, TX	92021	LMS
K212DG	90.3 FM	Bushland, TX	91956	LMS
K219CC	91.7 FM	Dumas, TX	1608	LMS
K212EO	90.3 FM	El Paso, TX	76809	LMS
K220JK	91.9 FM	Gardendale, TX	88872	LMS
K220KA	91.9 FM	Kerrville, TX	121236	LMS
K225AV	92.9 FM	Midland, TX	139993	LMS
K218CF	91.5 FM	New Braunfels, TX	78621	LMS
K220JY	91.9 FM	Odessa, TX	76817	LMS
K209GG	89.7 FM	Paris, TX	92772	LMS
K220GL	91.9 FM	Pleasanton, TX	87709	LMS
K204DX	88.7 FM	San Antonio, TX	91767	LMS
K292FF	106.3 FM	Terrell Wells, TX	138666	LMS

== Utah ==
Call sign	Frequency	City of license	FID	FCC info
K220HI	91.9 FM	Clarkston, UT	92437	LMS
K209FP	89.7 FM	Ephraim, UT	92963	LMS
K201CW	88.1 FM	Moab, UT	8431	LMS
K213CQ	90.5 FM	Salt Lake City, UT	89166	LMS
K201DP	88.1 FM	St. George, UT	82787	LMS
K203CQ	88.5 FM	Tooele, UT	77061	LMS
K202EJ	88.3 FM	Wellsville, UT	93021	LMS

== Vermont ==
Call sign	Frequency	City of license	FID	FCC info
W207AX	89.3 FM	Burlington, VT	21097	LMS

== Virginia ==
Call sign	Frequency	City of license	FID	FCC info
W204BH	88.7 FM	Boones Mill, VA	92374	LMS
W218CV	91.5 FM	Fredericksburg, VA	93601	LMS
W237DR	95.3 FM	Martinsville, VA	87024	LMS
W219CX	91.7 FM	Richmond, VA	94033	LMS
W224BS	92.7 FM	Roanoke, VA	140013	LMS

== Washington ==
Call sign	Frequency	City of license	FID	FCC info
K204ET	88.7 FM	Aberdeen, Washington	77003	LMS
K273AI	102.5 FM	Ariel, Washington	93257	LMS
K210CN	89.9 FM	Bellingham, Washington	92022	LMS
K206DM	89.1 FM	Bremerton, Washington	87314	LMS
K220HE	91.9 FM	Chehalis, Washington	91974	LMS
K206CL	89.1 FM	Chinook, Washington	92352	LMS
K228DU	93.5 FM	Clarkston, Washington	143019	LMS
K218DF	91.5 FM	Cle Elum, Washington	106582	LMS
K201FD	88.1 FM	Forks, Washington	92132	LMS
K279AK	103.7 FM	Granger, Washington	151518	LMS
K206DL	89.1 FM	Granite Falls, Washington	92481	LMS
K297BD	107.3 FM	Greenwater, Washington	91810	LMS
K206CJ	89.1 FM	Issaquah, Washington	91156	LMS
K221DV	92.1 FM	Kamilche, Washington	92815	LMS
K204CZ	88.7 FM	Kennewick, Washington	88517	LMS
K202ED	88.3 FM	Mount Vernon, Washington	86755	LMS
K297BH	107.3 FM	Mount Vernon, Washington	91872	LMS
K223BC	92.5 FM	Naches, Washington	148441	LMS
K205GL	88.9 FM	Olympia, Washington	89649	LMS
K289AK	105.7 FM	Orting, Washington	142691	LMS
K202DS	88.3 FM	Port Angeles, Washington	91288	LMS
K275BW	102.9 FM	Sequim, Washington	93040	LMS
K209FQ	89.7 FM	Shelton, Washington	91130	LMS
K208FX	89.5 FM	Twisp, Washington	88141	LMS
K208EY	89.5 FM	Wenatchee, Washington	86506	LMS
K218CX	91.5 FM	Yakima, Washington	92020	LMS

== Wisconsin ==
Call sign	Frequency	City of license	FID	FCC info
W209BM	89.7 FM	De Pere, WI	93795	LMS
W204BP	88.7 FM	Eau Claire, WI	91966	LMS
W205CM	88.9 FM	Manitowoc, WI	92411	LMS
W212CQ	90.3 FM	Menomonie, WI	77607	LMS
W204BK	88.7 FM	Sherwood, WI	92654	LMS

== Wyoming ==
Call sign	Frequency	City of license	FID	FCC info
K212GA	90.3 FM	Evanston, WY	92087	LMS
K262AI	100.3 FM	Laramie, WY	76791	LMS
K217DG	91.3 FM	Rawlins, WY	92133	LMS
K228ED	93.5 FM	Thermopolis, WY	154989	LMS
K201HS	88.1 FM	Worland, WY	155135	LMS
