= Maple Creek =

Maple Creek may refer to:

- Maple Creek, California
- Rural Municipality of Maple Creek No. 111, Saskatchewan
  - Maple Creek, Saskatchewan

Maple Creek (electoral district), Canadian riding in Saskatchewan
Maple Creek (provincial electoral district), provincial riding in Saskatchewan

- Maple Creek (Saskatchewan), a river in Saskatchewan
- Maple Creek, Wisconsin
- Maple Creek crater
