= Hurricane Isbell =

Category 3 Atlantic hurricane in 1964

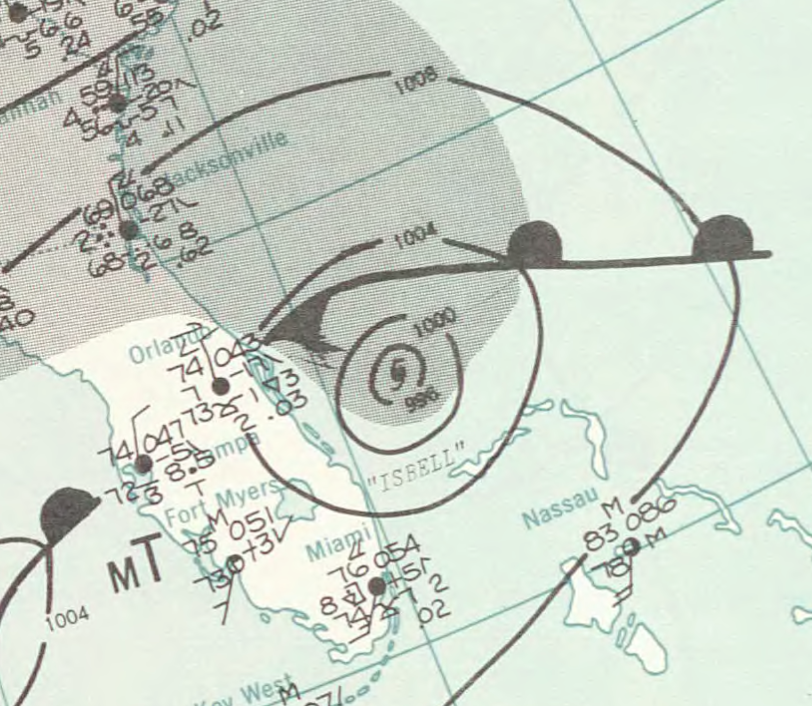
- Surface weather analysis of the hurricane off eastern Florida on October 15

Meteorological history
- Formed: October 8, 1964
- Extratropical: October 16, 1964
- Dissipated: October 19, 1964

Category 3 major hurricane
- 1-minute sustained (SSHWS/NWS)
- Highest winds: 115 mph (185 km/h)
- Lowest pressure: 964 mbar (hPa); 28.47 inHg

Overall effects
- Fatalities: 7 total
- Damage: $30 million (1964 USD)
- Areas affected: Cuba; East Coast of the United States
- IBTrACS
- Part of the 1964 Atlantic hurricane season

Hurricane Isbell was the final hurricane to affect the United States during the 1964 season. The eleventh tropical storm and sixth hurricane of the season, Isbell developed from a dissipating cold front in the southwestern Caribbean on October 8. The depression initially remained disorganized as it track northwestward, but strengthened into Tropical Storm Isbell on October 13. Re-curving northeastward, Isbell quickly strengthened further and reached hurricane status by later that day. Late on October 13, Isbell made landfall in the Pinar del Río Province of Cuba. The storm continued strengthening and peaked as a Category 3 hurricane on the following day. Isbell moved northeastward and made landfall near Everglades City, Florida, late on October 14. After reaching the Atlantic on the following day, the storm began to weaken. Isbell turned northward and continued weakening, before transitioning to an extratropical cyclone while located just offshore eastern North Carolina on October 16.

The storm produced strong winds throughout western Cuba. Hundreds of homes were destroyed, as were several tobacco warehouses. There was at least $20 million in damage and four deaths in Cuba, three of them caused by collapsing houses in the Guane area. The storm also spawned at least nine tornadoes in Florida, several of which demolished trailers and unroofed homes and other buildings in several communities, causing significant damage. Throughout the state, one house was destroyed, 33 were severely damaged, and 631 suffered minor impact. Additionally, 66 trailers were destroyed and 88 were afflicted with major damage. Three deaths occurred in the state, one due to a heart attack and two from drowning in Florida Keys when their shrimp boat sank. Because the storm weakened considerably, impact in North Carolina was generally minor. Damage throughout the United States totaled $10 million.

== Meteorological history ==
Map plotting the storm's track and intensity, according to the Saffir–Simpson scale Map key Saffir–Simpson scale Tropical depression (≤38 mph, ≤62 km/h) Tropical storm (39–73 mph, 63–118 km/h) Category 1 (74–95 mph, 119–153 km/h) Category 2 (96–110 mph, 154–177 km/h) Category 3 (111–129 mph, 178–208 km/h) Category 4 (130–156 mph, 209–251 km/h) Category 5 (≥157 mph, ≥252 km/h) Unknown Storm type Tropical cyclone Subtropical cyclone Extratropical cyclone, remnant low, tropical disturbance, or monsoon depression

Hurricane Isbell was first identified as a weak tropical disturbance on October 7 over the western Caribbean. Situated to the south of a diffuse trough, the system remained weak and relatively disorganized as it moved generally northwest near Honduras and Nicaragua. Despite the presence of an upper-level anticyclone, which promotes favorable outflow for tropical cyclones and aids in tropical cyclogenesis, a lack of distinct low-level inflow inhibited intensification. Additionally, an area of warm mid-tropospheric air was present within the cyclone. Though a disheveled system, it is analyzed to have become a tropical depression by 06:00 UTC on October 9. The depression skirted the eastern coast of Honduras, producing gusts of 40 mph (64 km/h) in squalls. Operationally, it was not until October 10 that the Weather Bureau initiated advisories on the depression. On that date, a weather reconnaissance mission into the system found a weak low-level circulation with a barometric pressure of 1007.3 mb (hPa; 29.75 inHg) and winds of 20–30 mph (32–48 km/h). Throughout October 11 and 12, the cyclone slowly executed a tight cyclonic loop over the northwestern Caribbean Sea, alternating between depression and storm status; it was initially named Isbell for 12 hours on October 11. Ship and aircraft data showed a larger-than-usual radius of outermost closed isobar (ROCI), with the strongest winds far from the center, though Isbell shrank its wind field after completing the loop and acquiring a north-northeast trajectory.

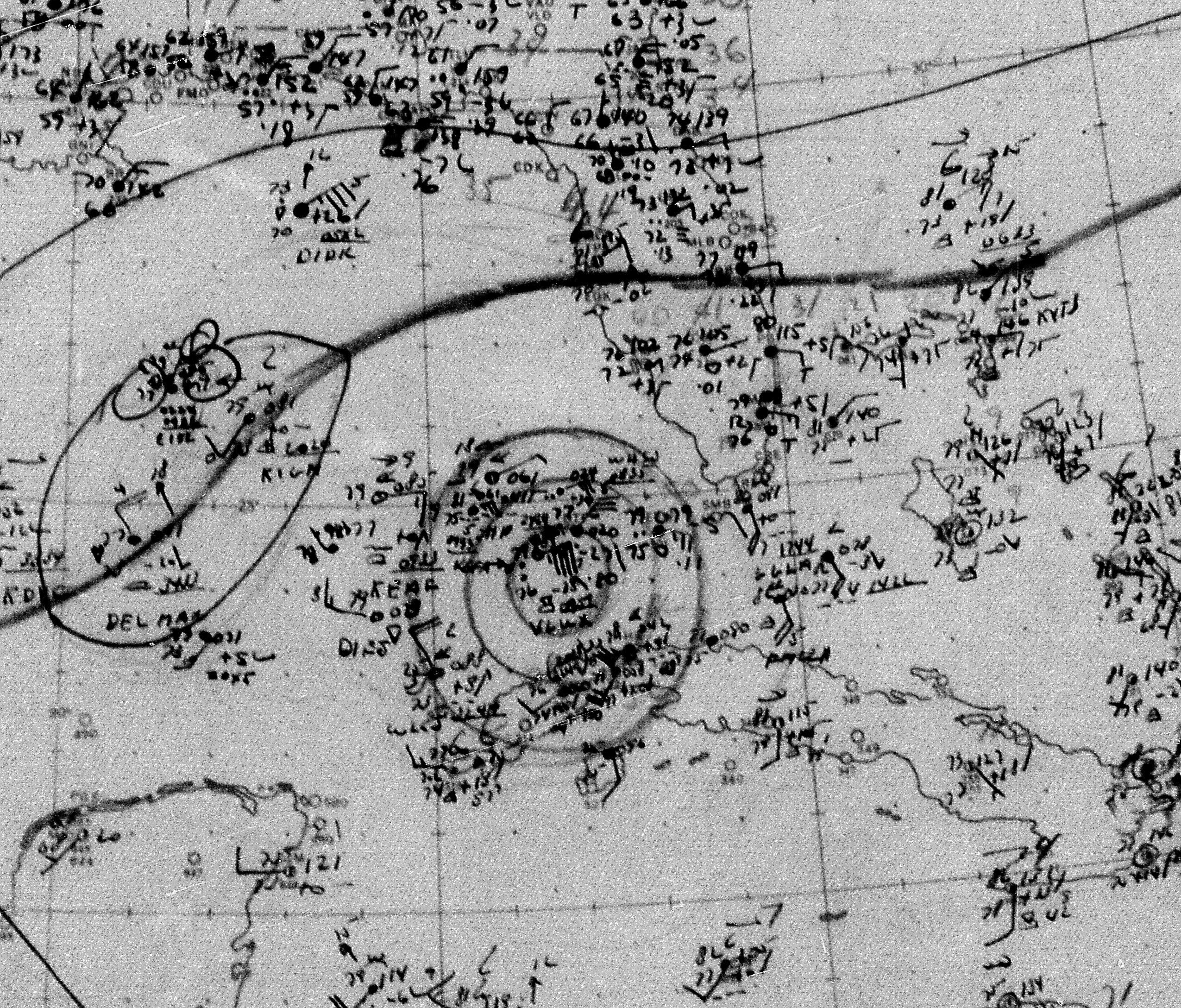
Surface weather analysis of Hurricane Isbell and the nearby non-tropical low over the Gulf of Mexico at 12:00 UTC on October 14

Starting on October 12, marked intensification of the cyclone occurred, as shown by ship reports next day. Vessels clocked winds up to 150 mph (240 km/h)—deemed too high by reanalysis—and pressures down to 983 mb (hPa; 29.03 inHg), showing that Isbell acquired hurricane status. Over a 24‑hour span, ending at 18:00 UTC, its central pressure fell from 996 mb (hPa; 29.68 inHg) to under 979 mb (hPa; 28.91 inHg), (Note: The latter was read on an inland barometer over Cuba, as the eye of the storm passed overhead, implying a lower but uncertain value on the coast.) reflected in Isbell's winds doubling from 50 to 100 mph (85 to 155 km/h). An hour later, the storm made landfall in extreme western Cuba, near Guane, before emerging over the southeastern Gulf of Mexico; Isbell turned northeast as it did so. Aside from some loss of intensity, Isbell's brief stint over land did not hinder development, which continued unabated until 12:00 UTC on October 14, at which time it reached its maximum intensity. Situated southwest of Key West, Florida, Isbell attained winds of 115 mph (185 km/h), making it a Category 3 (major) hurricane on the Saffir–Simpson scale. Additionally, its central pressure bottomed out at 964 mb (hPa; 28.47 inHg). Around this time, a new low-pressure area formed 300 mi (480 km) to Isbell's northwest over the Gulf in response to a powerful cold-core low over the Mississippi Valley. The cyclonic flow of this second system brought cool, dry air from the north and circulated it into the hurricane. This in turn caused the storm to become asymmetric in structure with radar imagery indicating little to no reflectivity along the western periphery of the hurricane. In its date and place of origin, as well as its trek toward Florida, Isbell was described by the Monthly Weather Review as a "typical mid-October hurricane".

The degrading structure of Isbell resulted in some weakening as it accelerated toward Florida. At 21:00 UTC the hurricane made landfall near Everglades City as a Category 2 with sustained winds of 105 mph (165 km/h). Due to its quick motion, (Note: Up to 20 mph (32 km/h)) its eye lingered for only 20 minutes at any given point. Within five hours, the system cleared the peninsula and emerged over the western Atlantic Ocean north of West Palm Beach. The storm's passage over land resulted in notable weakening, though Isbell remained of hurricane strength. During the afternoon of October 15, the low that had formed the previous day induced a northward turn of the cyclone and directed it toward North Carolina, a result of what is known as the Fujiwhara effect. Thereafter, the two systems began to intertwine as Isbell began transitioning into an extratropical cyclone; rapid weakening accompanied this phase. Isbell completed this process by 18:00 UTC on October 16, five hours after moving ashore Morehead City, North Carolina, as a strong tropical storm. As it interfaced with the low, Isbell generated light winds, a temperature rise, and a pressure of 994 mb (hPa; 29.35 inHg) at a weather station in Cherry Point, denoting a central value of 992 mb (hPa; 29.29 inHg); (Note: This hinted at winds of 64 to 69 mph (104 to 111 km/h), based on pressure–wind relations.) sensor data from the site and nearby Morehead City evinced a compact ring of warm air temperatures around the center. On October 17 the two non-tropical systems merged into a single storm over the Outer Banks. Isbell's remnants emerged back over the Atlantic Ocean on October 18 near the Delmarva Peninsula before accelerating northeast. The system was last noted on October 19 as it moved over Atlantic Canada.

== Preparations ==
Summary of warnings and watches associated with Hurricane Isbell for the United States
Warning type	Date	Time issued	State	Areas/changes to previous
Hurricane warning	October 13	22:00 UTC	Florida	Dry Tortugas
Hurricane watch	October 13	22:00 UTC	Florida	Lower Florida Keys to Tampa
Gale warning	October 13	22:00 UTC	Florida	Dry Tortugas to Marathon
Hurricane watch	October 14	01:00 UTC	Florida	Extended east to Key Largo
Gale warning	October 14	01:00 UTC	Florida	Extended east to Key Largo
Hurricane warning	October 14	04:00 UTC	Florida	Extended east to Key West and Marathon; raised for areas between Flamingo and Fort Myers
Hurricane watch	October 14	10:00 UTC	Florida	Extended northward to Cape Kennedy, including Lake Okeechobee
Gale warning	October 14	10:00 UTC	Florida	Extended northward to Cape Kennedy, including Lake Okeechobee
Hurricane warning	October 14	16:00 UTC	Florida	Fort Lauderdale to Vero Beach, including Lake Okeechobee
Hurricane warning	October 14	22:00 UTC	Florida	Extended northward to Cape Kennedy
Hurricane watch	October 14	22:00 UTC	Florida	Extended northward to Daytona Beach
Gale warning	October 14	22:00 UTC	Florida	Extended northward to Daytona Beach
Advisories discontinued	October 15	01:00 UTC	Florida	Tampa southward to the Dry Tortugas
Advisories discontinued	October 15	04:00 UTC	Florida	The west coast of Florida south of Fort Lauderdale and the east coast south of Cape Kennedy
Advisories discontinued	October 15	10:00 UTC	Florida	All advisories discontinued
Gale warning	October 15	10:00 UTC	North Carolina, Virginia	Cape Hatteras, North Carolina, northward to the Virginia Capes
Hurricane watch	October 15	14:30 UTC	South Carolina, North Carolina	Charleston, South Carolina, northward, encompassing the entire North Carolina coastline
Gale warning	October 15	14:30 UTC	South Carolina, North Carolina	Charleston, South Carolina, northward, encompassing the entire North Carolina coastline
Hurricane warning	October 15	16:00 UTC	South Carolina, North Carolina	Georgetown, South Carolina, northward to Morehead City, North Carolina

In Cuba, thousands were evacuated due to flooding lowlands. Advisories were broadcast and issued warning of the possibility of heavy rains and winds, isolated small hail, and possible isolated tornadoes in Florida from 21:00 UTC on October 14 to 02:00 UTC on October 15. The aviation severe weather forecast also warned residents in south and central Florida of up to 0.75 in (19 mm) of hail, gusts of up to 53 mph (85 km/h), and the potential for tornadic activity. Flood warnings were also issued, with predictions of flooding 4 ft (1.2 m) above flood stage. Emergency preparations at Key West's weather office were made. In the morning hours of October 13, the office alerted city, county, and military officials. In the afternoon, it completed office preparations and scheduling. On October 14, the office requested radio stations to stay on the air and relayed hourly reports.

In North Carolina, some tidal flooding was also forecast. People were warned to tune to television and radio broadcasts. On October 15, as Isbell rapidly crossed Florida, forecasters at the Charleston Weather Bureau warned of high tides of up to 12 ft (3.7 m), 5 ft (1.5 m) above flood stage, in the Carolinas. Owing to the continued northeastward movement of the storm, tides ultimately did not exceed 2 ft (0.61 m) in South Carolina. Across coastal areas of North Carolina, alerts for severe thunderstorms, tornadoes, and high tides were raised; however, the storm greatly diminished before reaching shore and little damage materialized. Moderate rains along the lower Neuse River basin were expected to prolong flooding triggered by Hurricane Hilda and its remnants earlier in October. Small craft advisories were raised northward to Provincetown, Massachusetts, through October 18.

== Impact ==
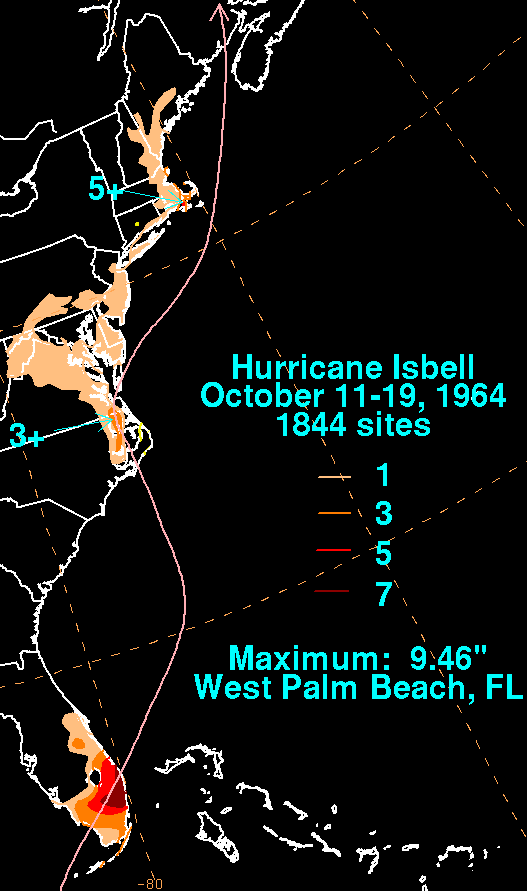
Map of the Eastern United States depicting rainfall produced by Hurricane Isbell. Between 30 and 80% of the rainfall in Florida fell several days in advance of the storm along a frontal zone.

=== Cuba ===
Skirting the extreme western coast of Cuba on October 13, the storm produced gusts estimated at 100 mph (160 km/h) in Pinar del Río Province. The highest measured sustained winds were 85 mph (137 km/h) in Guane and 70 mph (110 km/h) at Rancho-Boyeros Airport in the capital city of Havana. Additionally, pressures at the city fell to 979 mbar (hPa; 28.91 inHg). Heavy rains caused rivers to over-top their banks, forcing thousands of people to evacuate. Three fatalities occurred in Guane due to collapsing homes. A fourth fatality took place elsewhere in Cuba. Numerous homes were damaged or destroyed by the storm, with exact numbers unknown. The region's tobacco crop also sustained considerable losses with fields and warehouses destroyed. The damage to agriculture compounded economic losses in Cuba that resulted from Hurricane Flora in September 1963, which devastated the nation, as well as impacts from Hurricanes Cleo and Hilda earlier in 1964. The combined effects of Cleo, Hilda, and Isbell resulted in economic losses of approximately $100 million in the country, of which at least $20 million was directly attributed to Isbell.

=== Florida ===
Though Isbell struck the state as a Category 2 hurricane, no winds in excess of 100 mph (160 km/h) were reported. Measurements peaked at 90 mph (140 km/h) at both Everglades City and Indiantown, confined to a narrow coastal zone. Hurricane-force gusts were measured in Belle Glade, Fort Lauderdale, Key West, Pompano Beach, and West Palm Beach. Atmospheric pressures fell to 970.7 mb (hPa; 28.67 inHg) in the Dry Tortugas and 977.5 mb (hPa; 28.87 inHg) on the mainland in Juno Beach. Rainfall in the state was relatively limited owing to the brisk movement of the storm, though a frontal system immediately preceding the hurricane brought heavy rains to the state. A peak total of 9.46 in (240 mm) was measured in West Palm Beach, though an estimated 80% of this was attributable to the front. Amounts from the hurricane itself were likely around 5 in (130 mm). No major storm surge was reported during Isbell's passage due to greatly weaker winds in the back half of the storm. Tides in Key West rose 4 to 5 ft (1.2 to 1.5 m) above normal.

Throughout Florida, three people were killed in relation to the storm and no more than $10 million in damage occurred, with more than half of which was attributed to agricultural losses. In addition, 76 people were injured, 12 of whom required hospitalization. Structural damage was relatively limited, with only 63 homes and businesses, mostly trailers, being destroyed; 159 other structures sustained major damage while a further 631 experienced minor damage. The majority of damage from Isbell was not from the hurricane itself but rather tornadoes spawned by its outer bands. (Note: An eyewitness cited equal losses from tornadoes and other effects.) At least nine, and as many as seventeen, (Note: Multiple sources listed 11 or more, and the National Hurricane Center in its annual report noted "at least" 13, though the official total was nine.) tornadoes affected the state with the greatest effects being felt in the Miami metropolitan area, setting a contemporary record for hurricane-spawned tornadoes until Hurricane Beulah three years later. As Isbell headed northeast, the tornadoes formed close to the eye in its right-front quadrant, with activity centered mainly on coastal eastern Florida between Eau Gallie and Coral Gables. All storm-related injuries were attributed to these tornadoes as well as the majority of structural damage. According to the National Climatic Data Center, four of these tornadoes were of F2 (strong) intensity. At least one tornado family was verified, consisting of serial tornadoes fostered by a single thunderstorm.

Despite the close passage of the storm to the Florida Keys, damage in the area was light and amounted to $175,000. Of this, $125,000 was attributed to structural damage. Hurricane-force winds in the archipelago only lasted 15 minutes and gale-force winds occurred over a 5-hour span. The brevity of damaging winds limited the effects of the storm. Most damage was constrained to downed trees, signs, and power poles. Two trailers were overturned, however, and an oil barge sank in the Key West Harbor. Two people drowned after their shrimp boat was destroyed. In and around the Fakahatchee Strand Preserve State Park, royal palms and poincianas were defoliated by the hurricane's winds. Downed trees and power lines in Collier County temporarily left many customers without phone and electrical service. Residents in nearby Lee Cypress stated that the effects from Isbell were worse than Hurricane Donna, which struck the region as a Category 4 in September 1960. An F1 tornado formed between Ochopee and Carnestown, leveling a chickee and utility shed. A roof and siding were carried 300 ft (91 m), while a cabin cruiser was moved 150 ft (46 m) into the nearby Everglades.

In Dade County a brief, small (F1) tornado hit Coral Gables, downing trees and power lines. It also damaged three businesses, shattering bottles and nine windows at a liquor store. It caused at least one injury. At least three more tornadoes were reported countywide. An F2 tornado also tracked from near Dania Beach to Sunrise in Broward County, damaging half a dozen light aircraft at Fort Lauderdale–Hollywood International Airport, razing a home, downing trees, and unroofing a clubhouse at a country club. Three airplanes were torn from their tie-downs.

Palm Beach County was the most affected area, accounting for more than half of the losses, and approximately $700,000 in damage. One indirect death occurred when a man suffered a heart attack in Lake Worth while installing storm shutters. At least three tornadoes were spawned in Palm Beach County. The strongest was an F2 that struck a trailer park in Briny Breezes, damaging 25 trailers, 12 of which it razed, (Note: Another source listed 20.) along with power poles and trees. It injured 22 people. Shortly thereafter a second, weaker (F1) tornado—possibly the same one—struck Boynton Beach, injuring three people, unroofing four homes, and smashing windows, carports, and businesses. The event lasted roughly 20 minutes and the tornadoes moved along a path 10 mi (16 km) long. Another tornado in Boca Raton caused a number of minor injuries, damaging screen enclosures, awnings, windows, and shrubs. In West Palm Beach, an F1 tornado that crossed the intersection of State Roads 802 and 809 damaged adjacent properties and injured several people. It felled trees, poles, and signs as well. A tornado reportedly hit Belle Glade, wrecking several trailers and downing trees on U.S. Route 441. Another tornado struck a microwave tower in Loxahatchee. Multiple tornadoes damaged various buildings in Lake Worth. Throughout Palm Beach County, 492 homes suffered damage, while 36 mobile homes were demolished and 60 others were inflicted major impact. Additionally, 33 farm buildings and 9 small businesses were severely damaged or destroyed.

In Martin County, about 39 homes and 13 mobile homes were damaged, while two farm buildings and two businesses also received impact. An F2 was spawned in Hobe Sound and affected the area near U.S. Route 1, mangling a garage, half a citrus stand, and several dozen pines. It also unroofed three trailers, lofting debris 300 ft (91 m). Another tornado, officially unconfirmed, also caused a trailer collision in Stuart, piling up wreckage. The fourth F2 tornado was spawned in Brevard County near Eau Gallie, tracking 3 to 4 mi (4.8 to 6.4 km). It caused extensive damage, leveling over 12 trailers, while unroofing a church and three homes. 17 people were slightly injured in the Orange Court trailer park. Collectively, 35 homes in Flagler and Volusia counties were damaged.

==== Tornado outbreak ====
Confirmed tornadoes by Fujita rating
FU	F0	F1	F2	F3	F4	F5	Total
0	0	5	4	0	0	0	≥ 9

As Isbell headed northeast through Florida, a string of tornadoes—estimates of which ranged from 12 to 17 (Note: Multiple sources listed 11 or more, and the National Hurricane Center in its annual report noted "at least" 13, though the official total was nine.)—formed in its right-front quadrant around the eye, setting a contemporary record for hurricane-spawned tornadoes until Hurricane Beulah three years later. Tornado activity centered mainly on coastal eastern Florida between Eau Gallie and Coral Gables, causing 50 minor injuries, which represented the entire storm total. The tornado series accounted for "a considerable portion" (Note: In Palm Beach County almost half of all storm-related losses were tied to tornadoes. The Cocoa Tribune ascribed most of them to tornadoes.) of storm damage in South Florida, according to an official report. At least one tornado family was verified, consisting of serial tornadoes fostered by a single thunderstorm.

Confirmed tornadoes – Wednesday, October 14, 1964 (Note: All dates are based on the local time zone where the tornado touched down; however, all times are in Coordinated Universal Time and dates are split at midnight CST/CDT for consistency.)
F#	Location	County / Parish	State	Start Coord. (Note: Coordinates are taken from the NCEI database and may not reflect contemporary analyses.)	Time (UTC)	Path length	Width (Note: The values listed are mainly the average/mean, with known maximum widths denoted by ♯. From 1952 to 1994, reports largely list mean width whereas current years list maximum width. Values adopted by Grazulis are the average width, with estimates being rounded down (i.e. 0.5 mi (0.80 km) is rounded down from 880 yards to 800 yards).)
F1	Between Ochopee and Carnestown (Note: According to the Fort Myers News-Press)	Collier	FL	25.9°N 81.5°W	20:15–?	0.1 mi (0.16 km)	33 yd (30 m)
F1	A utility shed disintegrated and portions of the roof and siding were carried 300 ft (91 m). A chickee was flattened as well, and a cabin cruiser was moved 150 ft (46 m) into the nearby Everglades. Losses totaled $250. The National Centers for Environmental Information (NCEI) list a touchdown point east-northeast of Dismal Key, but Storm Data mentioned Carnestown.						
F1	Coral Gables	Dade	FL	25.75°N 80.25°W	~20:30–? (Note: According to the Miami Herald)	0.1 mi (0.16 km)	75 yd (69 m) (Note: Accordin to Storm Data)
F1	A brief, small tornado downed trees and power lines. It also damaged three businesses, shattering bottles and nine windows at a liquor store. At least one injury occurred. Additionally, one or more homes sustained damage. Losses totaled $2,500.						
F1	Boca Raton	Palm Beach	FL	26.35°N 80.08°W	21:00–?	0.1 mi (0.16 km)	33 yd (30 m)
F1	A short-lived tornado struck a home, tearing off a screen enclosure. It also damaged nearby screens, awnings, windows, and shrubs. Three injuries occurred. Losses totaled $2,500.						
F1	Boynton Beach	Palm Beach	FL	26.53°N 80.07°W	~22:24–? (Note: According to the Palm Beach Post)	0.1 mi (0.16 km)	33 yd (30 m)
F1	Related to the next event, (Note: Grazulis merged both tornadoes.) this tornado ripped off a few carports, unroofing four homes. Windows were broken as well, and many businesses were badly affected. A vehicle overturned, lightly injuring three occupants. Losses totaled $2,500.						
F2	Briny Breezes	Palm Beach	FL	26.47°N 80.07°W	22:24–?	≥ 0.1 mi (0.16 km) (Note: News media and Grazulis cited a 1-mile (1.6 km) path.)	100 yd (91 m)
F2	A strong tornado hit a trailer park, impacting 25 trailers, 12 of which it razed, (Note: Another source listed 20.) along with power poles and trees. The tornado curled erratically, halving a trailer and casting it into a marina. 22 or more injuries occurred. Losses totaled $250,000. (Note: A local mayor listed $150,000.)						
F1	SW of Atlantis to Lake Worth Corridor to SW of Golden Lakes (Note: According to the Palm Beach Post)	Palm Beach	FL	26.72°N 80.07°W	23:00–?	≥ 0.1 mi (0.16 km)	33 yd (30 m)
F1	A sporadic tornado crossed Military Trail around SR 802, ruining a tavern, breaking windows, and scattering liquor. It also smashed garage doors, tipped semi-trucks onto their sides, damaged a fire station, and felled trees and poles. Damage to homes was mostly cosmetic, limited to roofing and ceilings. Furniture, a lawn mower, and an automobile were tossed. Signs were blown down at the South Florida Fair. Three people were injured. Losses totaled $25,000.						
F2	Eau Gallie	Brevard	FL	28.13°N 80.63°W	01:20–?	≥ 0.1 mi (0.16 km) (Note: One report noted a length of 3 to 4 mi (4.8 to 6.4 km).)	33 yd (30 m)
F2	A tornado leveled over 12 trailers, unroofing a church and three homes. A home was thrown over a street, hitting a car and another home. It landed 100 yd (91 m) away. 17 minor injuries occurred. Losses totaled $250,000. (Note: Local media listed $100,000.)						
F2	Hobe Sound	Martin	FL	27.05°N 80.12°W	02:15–? (Note: According to the Stuart News)	0.1 mi (0.16 km)	33 yd (30 m)
F2	Forming alongside U.S. Route 1, this tornado unroofed three trailers, lofting debris 300 ft (91 m). It also mangled a garage, half a citrus stand, and several dozen pines. Losses totaled $2,500. Grazulis did not list the tornado, implying a lower rating than F2.						
F2	NW of Dania Beach to Sunrise (Note: According to the Fort Lauderdale Daily News)	Broward	FL	26.07°N 80.2°W	03:50–?	≥ 0.1 mi (0.16 km)	33 yd (30 m)
F2	A tornado struck Fort Lauderdale–Hollywood International Airport, damaging half a dozen light aircraft, razing a home, and downing trees. Three airplanes were torn from their tie-downs. The tornado also unroofed a nearby clubhouse at a country club. Losses totaled $25,000.						

===== Other tornadoes =====
An Associated Press dispatch stated that half a dozen tornadoes hit Palm Beach County and three more in Dade County. A tornado reportedly hit Belle Glade, wrecking several trailers and downing trees on U.S. Route 441. Another tornado struck a microwave tower in Loxahatchee. Multiple tornadoes damaged various buildings in Lake Worth. A tornado also caused a trailer collision in Stuart, piling up wreckage. Official records do not show these tornadoes, however.

=== The Carolinas and elsewhere ===
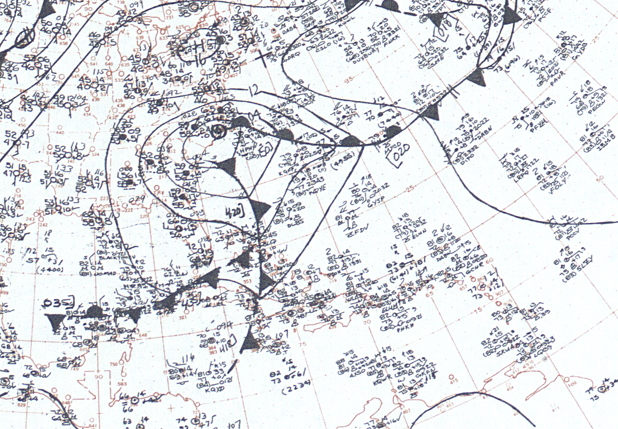
Surface analysis of Hurricane Isbell's extratropical remnants on October 16 over The Carolinas

Heavy rains associated with Isbell and a nearby non-tropical low resulted in heavy rains across The Carolinas on October 15 and 16. In and around the Columbia, South Carolina area, 3 to 6 in (76 to 152 mm) of rain fell, with a peak of 6.11 in (155 mm) in the city itself. Significant flooding took place along all rivers in the state; the Broad River crested at 32.1 ft (9.8 m), its highest level since 1940, in Blair. The Pee Dee River rose to 39 ft (12 m) at Cheraw by October 18, roughly 9 ft (2.7 m) above flood-stage. The cotton crop sustained the greatest losses during the event, with damage estimated in excess of $1 million. Along the coast, tides rose to 6.2 ft (1.9 m), 2.1 ft (0.64 m) above normal, in Charleston Harbor. What little coastal flooding took place mostly resulted from wave run-up rather than tidal flooding. Some beach erosion occurred in exposed areas.

Much of North Carolina was affected by Isbell with rain extending into interior parts of the state. Totals were generally light, however, and peaked at around 5 in (130 mm) in eastern areas. Some flash flooding took place in the Piedmont, though overall effects were minimal. In the Blue Ridge Mountains, the French Broad River topped its banks and prompted evacuations in Hot Springs and Marshall. The greatest impacts were felt along the Neuse River in Kinston within Lenoir County. Rains from Isbell exacerbated ongoing floods in the area, resulting in heavy damage to many homes. A man was swept away by swift currents near a Duke Energy steam plant in Cliffside; however, it is unknown if he perished or was later rescued. Losses to the peanut crop were extensive, though no monetary value is available. With the storm arriving at low-tide, no notable coastal flooding occurred. The significant weakening of Isbell prior to landfall also lessened the effects from wind as gale-force winds were mostly constrained to coastal areas; a peak gust of 75 mph (121 km/h) was measured in Elizabeth City.

Elsewhere along the East Coast, the remnants of Isbell produced generally light to moderate rain. A localized maximum of around 5 in (130 mm) occurred in Massachusetts as the system began to dissipate. Immediately following the storm, an unseasonably strong cold front brought near-freezing temperatures to Virginia, resulting in frost. The combination of the cold air and the hurricane prevented any peanut bumper crop harvesting in the state.

== See also ==
- List of Florida hurricanes
  - Tropical Storm Barry (2007)
  - Hurricane Wilma
  - Hurricane Dennis (1981)
  - Hurricane Charley
