= Tropical Storm Abby (1964) =

Atlantic tropical storm in 1964

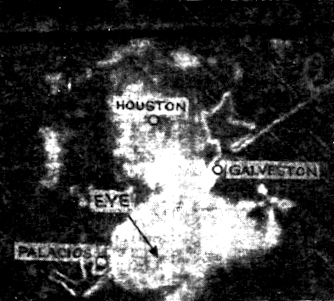
- Radar image of Abby roughly one hour before landfall on August 7

Meteorological history
- Formed: August 5, 1964
- Dissipated: August 8, 1964

Tropical storm
- 1-minute sustained (SSHWS/NWS)
- Highest winds: 70 mph (110 km/h)
- Lowest pressure: 1000 mbar (hPa); 29.53 inHg

Overall effects
- Fatalities: None reported
- Damage: $750,000 (1964 USD)
- Areas affected: Louisiana and Texas
- IBTrACS
- Part of the 1964 Atlantic hurricane season

Tropical Storm Abby was an exceptionally small tropical cyclone that had minor effects across Southeast Texas in early August 1964. Forming as a tropical depression out of a trough south of Louisiana on August 5, the system moved generally westward. It was not until August 7 that the system began to organize. That day, an eye rapidly formed within the system and it became a tropical storm just 60 mi (95 km) southeast of Galveston, Texas. Soon thereafter, a weather reconnaissance plane reported a barometric pressure of 1000 mbar (hPa; 29.53 inHg) at the storm's center. Around 18:00 UTC (1:00 p.m. CDT), the newly named Abby attained peak winds of 70 mph (115 km/h). It subsequently made landfall near Matagorda, Texas four hours later. Once onshore gradual weakening ensued, though a brief period of re-organization delayed its dissipation. Abby degenerated into an area of showers on August 8 southwest of San Antonio, Texas.

Prior to Abby's landfall in Texas, gale warnings were issued for the coast and residents on Matagorda Island were evacuated. Overall, the storm's impacts were limited due to its small size. Only two structures sustained damage in Matagorda, one being destroyed by a possible tornado, and the remaining effects resulted from flooding in Jackson and Victoria Counties. Total damage from the storm was estimated at $750,000 with the majority stemming from crops.

== Meteorological history ==
Map plotting the storm's track and intensity, according to the Saffir–Simpson scale Map key Saffir–Simpson scale Tropical depression (≤38 mph, ≤62 km/h) Tropical storm (39–73 mph, 63–118 km/h) Category 1 (74–95 mph, 119–153 km/h) Category 2 (96–110 mph, 154–177 km/h) Category 3 (111–129 mph, 178–208 km/h) Category 4 (130–156 mph, 209–251 km/h) Category 5 (≥157 mph, ≥252 km/h) Unknown Storm type Tropical cyclone Subtropical cyclone Extratropical cyclone, remnant low, tropical disturbance, or monsoon depression

On August 5, 1964, a weak trough emerged from Florida over the northeastern Gulf of Mexico. According to the Atlantic hurricane database (referred to as HURDAT), the system developed into a tropical depression by 18:00 UTC (1:00 p.m. CDT) that day, with its center located roughly 160 mi (255 km) south-southeast of the Mississippi River Delta. Moving generally west, the system exhibited no signs of further development as it neared the Texas coastline. However, on August 7, radar images from Brownsville, Galveston, Lake Charles, and Victoria showed an abrupt increase in organization. During the afternoon hours, banding features consolidated around a developing eye and weather reconnaissance planes were dispatched to the system. Forecasters initially mistook the eye as a hook echo-type feature at the end of a squall line. It is estimated that the depression became a tropical storm by 12:00 UTC (7:00 a.m. CDT), roughly 60 mi (95 km) southeast of Galveston, Texas. Operationally, the system was not even monitored as a depression this time, with the classification and naming of Tropical Storm Abby occurring at 16:00 UTC (11:00 a.m. CDT) on August 7.

Abby was an unusually small storm, with its entire circulation being far less than 100 mi (160 km) in diameter. Around 16:00 UTC (11:00 a.m. CDT) on August 7, reconnaissance measured a central barometric pressure of 1000 mbar (hPa; 29.53 inHg) within Abby, the lowest in relation to the system. They also reported peak winds of 85 mph (135 km/h) in squalls, which would rank as a Category 1 hurricane on the modern-day Saffir–Simpson hurricane wind scale. These winds were seen to be an overestimate by forecasters and discarded, however. The system attained its maximum winds of 65 mph (105 km/h) by 18:00 UTC (1:00 p.m. CDT) and subsequently made landfall just northeast of Matagorda, Texas at 22:00 UTC (5:00 p.m. CDT). Irvin Velbrecht, a forecaster at the Weather Bureau (now known as the National Weather Service) in Galveston, described the storm as a "perfectly miniature hurricane." Despite moving onshore, Abby's core continued to organize and it developed a closed eyewall roughly three hours later. Thereafter the storm began to gradually weaken, passing over Edna around 02:00 UTC on August 8 (9:00 p.m. CDT on August 7). Weakening to a depression hours later, Abby ultimately degenerated into an area of showers and dissipated southwest of San Antonio by 12:00 UTC (7:00 a.m. CDT).

== Preparations and impact ==
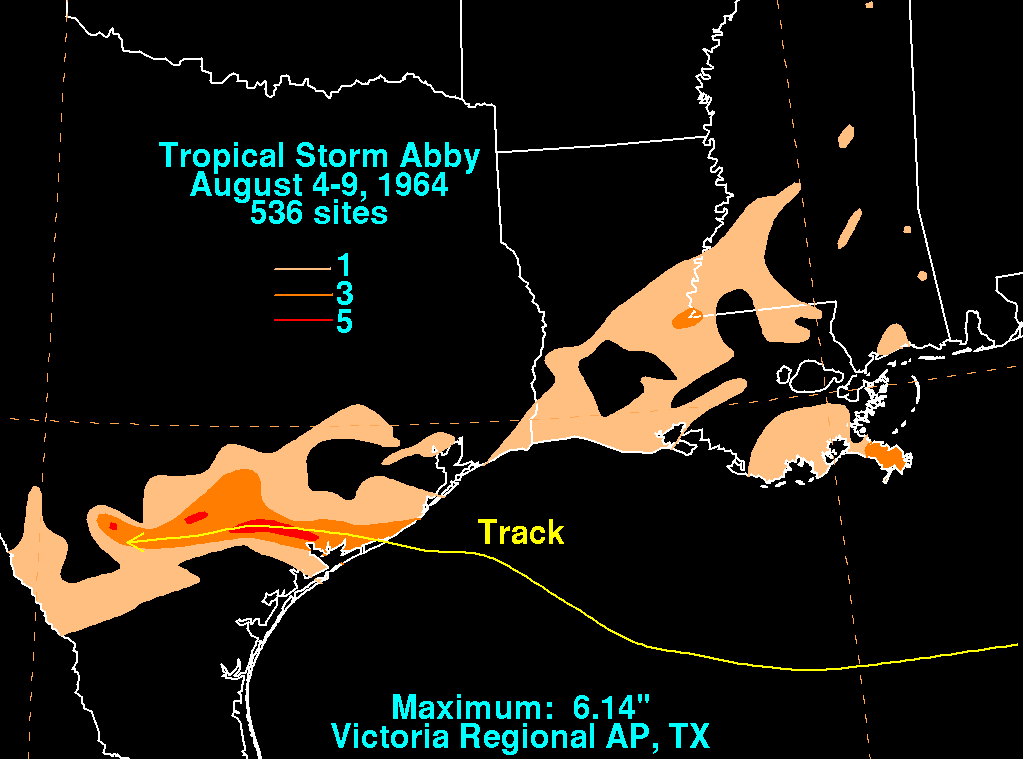
Rainfall from Tropical Storm Abby across Louisiana and Texas from August 4–8

Owing to the abrupt nature of Abby's development on August 7, residents had little time to prepare for the storm. According to Irvin Velbrecht, "in the absence of aircraft reconnaissance and radar information, two reasonably new tools in storm detection, Abby could well have formed and approached the shore before knowledge of a tropical storm was gained." Gale warnings were raised from Galveston to San Antonio immediately following the storm's formation and were kept in place through the morning of August 8. Evacuation orders were issued for Matagorda Island and most complied, with some deciding to remain at their homes. Personnel at Matagorda Island Air Force Base were evacuated to Victoria. Red Cross facilities were readied and public shelters were opened in the area. At the mouth of the Colorado River, seagoing vessels were tied down with extra rope. Within the Weather Bureau, members of the Galveston office were the first to notice the system and relayed to the other offices in the area to attune their radars to follow the system.

Abby's small size resulted in its effects being limited to areas within the immediate track. Sustained winds of 45 mph (70 km/h) with gusts to 65 mph (105 km/h) were measured by the Army Corps of Engineers in Matagorda. Near the town, a possible tornado unroofed a barn and tossed the structure 225 ft (69 m); this building previously had withstood the effects of Hurricane Carla in 1961. Winds estimated at 50 mph (80 km/h) tore part of the roof off a fishing warehouse in Matagorda itself. Along the coast, tides ranged from 2 to 4 ft (0.61 to 1.22 m) above normal from Matagorda to Freeport. Four men and five dogs required rescue after their vessel became stranded on the Colorado River.

Heavy rains accompanied the system across Texas. Most areas along the immediate track received at least 3 to 5 in (76 to 127 mm) of rain, with a peak value of 6.14 in (156 mm) recorded at the Victoria International Airport. The hardest hit areas were in Jackson and Victoria counties where the heaviest rains fell. In these areas, flooding and strong winds damaged the cotton and rice crops; however, effects of the rice crop were more limited due to losses from earlier storms as well as ongoing harvesting. Some flooding also took place across the Atascosa River watershed, but no damage resulted. Overall, property damage was estimated at $150,000 while agricultural losses reached $600,000.

== See also ==
- 1964 Atlantic hurricane season
- Hurricane Humberto (2007) – A storm that developed suddenly and rapidly in the same general area as Abby
- Similarly small tropical cyclones
  - Tropical Storm Marco (2008) – Regarded as the smallest tropical cyclone in recorded history with a gale radius of 11.5 mi (18.5 km)
  - Cyclone Tracy (1974) – Struck Darwin, Australia with a gale radius of 30 mi (48 km)
