= Hurricane Gladys (1964) =

Category 4 Atlantic hurricane in 1964

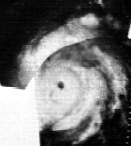
- Gladys at peak intensity on September 17

Meteorological history
- Formed: September 13, 1964
- Dissipated: September 24, 1964

Category 4 major hurricane
- 1-minute sustained (SSHWS/NWS)
- Highest winds: 130 mph (215 km/h)
- Lowest pressure: 945 mbar (hPa); 27.91 inHg

Overall effects
- Fatalities: 1
- Damage: $100,000 (1964 USD)
- Areas affected: East Coast of the United States, Atlantic Canada
- IBTrACS
- Part of the 1964 Atlantic hurricane season

Hurricane Gladys was a tropical cyclone that caused minor impact along the East Coast of the United States, Bermuda, and Atlantic Canada. The ninth named storm and fifth hurricane of the 1964 Atlantic hurricane season, Gladys developed from a tropical wave located east of the Lesser Antilles on September 13. Shortly thereafter, it strengthened into a tropical storm. On September 14, Gladys abruptly intensified into a Category 2 hurricane on the Saffir–Simpson hurricane wind scale. However, early on the following day, Gladys weakened slightly to a Category 1 hurricane. Between late on September 16 and late on September 17, the storm rapidly strengthened, peaking as a 145 mph (233 km/h) Category 4 hurricane on the latter. Gladys began weakening on the following day and curved northward on September 19.

The storm turned northwestward on September 22 and briefly threatened the East Coast of the United States. However, it veered northeastward on September 23 and moved rapidly toward Atlantic Canada. By 0000 UTC on September 25, Gladys became extratropical while centered between Sable Island and Nova Scotia. Along the East Coast of the United States, Gladys produced light rainfall, gusty winds, and storm surge. Coastal flooding was reported in North Carolina and Virginia. In the former, high tides inundated homes and buildings with 2 feet (0.61 m) of water in two small villages on the Outer Banks and flooded a highway to Manteo. In the state of Virginia, one death occurred when a man was fatally struck in the throat by debris. Tides also effected the Mid-Atlantic, New England, and Atlantic Canada.

== Meteorological history ==
Map plotting the storm's track and intensity, according to the Saffir–Simpson scale Map key Saffir–Simpson scale Tropical depression (≤38 mph, ≤62 km/h) Tropical storm (39–73 mph, 63–118 km/h) Category 1 (74–95 mph, 119–153 km/h) Category 2 (96–110 mph, 154–177 km/h) Category 3 (111–129 mph, 178–208 km/h) Category 4 (130–156 mph, 209–251 km/h) Category 5 (≥157 mph, ≥252 km/h) Unknown Storm type Tropical cyclone Subtropical cyclone Extratropical cyclone, remnant low, tropical disturbance, or monsoon depression

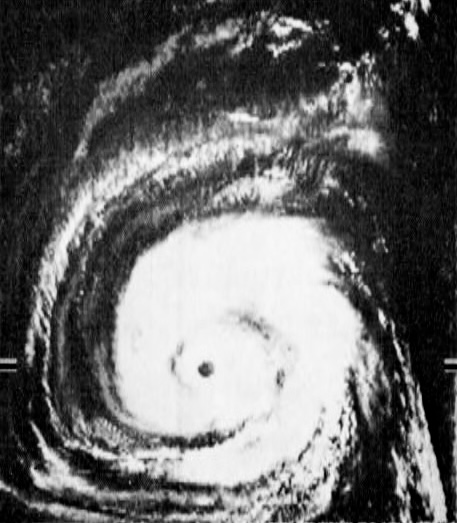
Satellite image of Gladys taken by NASA's Nimbus I weather satellite

A tropical wave was first observed over western Africa on September 8 and moved offshore in the vicinity of Dakar, Senegal on the following day. At 0600 UTC on September 13, a tropical depression developed while centered about halfway between Cape Verde and the Lesser Antilles. Later that day, the S.S. Gerwi reported heavy rain and winds of 63 mph (101 km/h), confirming the existence of Tropical Storm Gladys at 1200 UTC on September 13. Four hours later, the Weather Bureau Office in San Juan, Puerto Rico initiated advisories on Gladys. A hurricane hunter plane flew into Gladys on the afternoon of September 13 was unable to obtain wind data due to darkness. A reconnaissance flight into the storm on September 14 noted that it had strengthened into a hurricane, while moving west-northwestward at about 18 mph (29 km/h). HURDAT records indicate that around that time, Gladys became a Category 2 hurricane as winds reached 100 mph (160 km/h). However, early on September 15, Gladys weakened slightly to a Category 1 hurricane.

Early on September 17, the storm began to rapidly intensify. By 1800 UTC, Gladys attained its peak intensity with maximum sustained winds of 145 mph (233 km/h) and a minimum barometric pressure of 945 mbar (27.9 inHg). The storm later began to weaken and fell to a Category 3 hurricane early on September 19. Around that time, Gladys curved northward in response to a weak trough in the westerlies. Early on September 20, it further weakened to a Category 2 hurricane. Rising atmospheric pressures to the north forced the storm to curve northwestward on September 21. Later that day, Gladys weakened to a Category 1 hurricane. The storm posed a threat to the East Coast of the United States, and passed about 140 miles (230 km) east of Cape Hatteras, North Carolina, before a deepening low pressure area over the Great Lakes region caused it to veer northeastward. Gladys then accelerated and approached Atlantic Canada, before transitioning into an extratropical cyclone at 0000 UTC on September 25, while located between Nova Scotia and Sable Island. The extratropical remnants continued northeastward into Newfoundland and dissipated later on September 25.

== Preparations ==
As Gladys strengthened in the Atlantic Ocean, forecasters at the United States Weather Bureau predicted that the storm would bring high surf to areas as far north as North Carolina. Additionally, it was suggested that Gladys could have threatened northern Florida, as the storm was on a similar path as Hurricane Dora earlier in the month. As a result, residents along the coast of the Southeastern United States were advised to remain alert and small craft advisories were issued. On September 20, small craft advisories were issued for The Bahamas. After Gladys turned northwestward on September 21, forecasters at the United States Weather Bureau issued hurricane watches for North Carolina, Virginia, and some Mid-Atlantic states. Gale warnings and small craft advisories were issued on September 23 from Massachusetts to Rhode Island. In Rhode Island, ships of the United States Navy were diverted to Narragansett Bay as a precaution. At 0400 UTC on September 24, the gale warnings for New England were lowered as Gladys turned northeastward away from the coast however, small water craft were advised to remain in port until the seas subsided.

== Impact ==
=== United States ===
In the United States, Gladys produced high tides as far south as Florida and Georgia. Hurricane Gladys's effects on South Carolina was minimal as the center of the hurricane was a considerable distance from the coastline. The only effects Gladys was minor rainfall, peaking at 1 inch (25 mm) in Myrtle Beach, as well as storm tides of 2 feet (0.61 m) above normal along the upper coast of South Carolina.

In North Carolina, the large wind field of Gladys produced tropical storm force winds near Manteo. Waves produced by the strong winds flooded a highway leading away from Manteo. Between Kill Devil Hills and Nags Head, U.S. Route 158 was inundated by 2 feet (0.61 m) of water. Near Cape Hatteras, a weather station recorded sustained winds of 40 mph (64 km/h) and gusts up to 41 mph (66 km/h). Additionally, tides in the area ranged from 2–2.5 feet (0.61–0.76 m) above normal. The abnormal tides and heavy wave action flooded two small villages, leaving many homes and buildings under 2 feet (0.61 m) of water and washed away grasses that were planted to stabilize the sand dunes. In Wilmington, sustained winds of 25 mph (40 km/h) and gusts of 28 mph (45 km/h) were reported, as well as tides 2–3 feet (0.61–0.91 m) above normal. Elsewhere in the Outer Banks, high winds caused a mobile home to fall off its foundations and blew down two television antennas.

A weather station in Norfolk, Virginia recorded gusts of 38–44 mph (61–71 km/h) and 0.17 inches (4.3 mm) of rainfall. In Cape Henry, sustained winds of 42 mph (68 km/h) and a precipitation total of 0.02 inches (0.51 mm) were reported. Coastal sections of southeastern Virginia experienced tides 2.2–6.1 feet (0.67–1.86 m) above normal, resulting in minor tidal flooding. One indirect fatality was attributed from Gladys when a man suffered fatal wounds to his throat due to flying debris. High winds and strong ocean currents from Gladys produced beach erosion in New Jersey, New York and Massachusetts. In Rhode Island, the outer bands of Gladys produced light rainfall, peaking at 0.38 inches (9.7 mm). A boy was washed into the sea by the waves offshore Narragansett and was rescued by United States Coast Guard servicemen, who dove into the water after two previous attempts to rescue him failed.

=== Elsewhere ===
Hurricane Gladys produced rough seas that affected Puerto Rico, the Virgin Islands, the northern Leeward Islands and the northern Bahamas. The outer bands of Gladys also lashed Bermuda with winds but little damage if any was reported. In Atlantic Canada, Gladys passed over Newfoundland as a 70 mph (110 km/h) extratropical storm but no damage was reported. At St. John's Harbor, 65 ships took shelter as a precaution. Some ships suffered damage, including two foreign freighters.

== See also ==
- List of Florida hurricanes (1950–1974)
- Hurricane Daisy (1962)
