= Maple Creek, California =

Unincorporated community in California, United States

Maple Creek
- Unincorporated community
- Location in California Maple Creek (the United States)
- Coordinates: 40°45′44″N 123°52′09″W
- Country: United States
- State: California
- County: Humboldt
- Elevation: 528 ft (161 m)

Maple Creek (formerly, Maplecreek) is an unincorporated community in Humboldt County, California, United States. It is located 9 miles (14 km) south-southeast of Korbel, at an elevation of 528 feet (161 m).

A post office operated at Maple Creek from 1886 to 1923. Maple Creek once had a sawmill and a two-room school; the mill closed in the 1960s but the school remains, enrolling 12-18 students at a time.

== Climate ==
This region experiences warm (but not hot) and dry summers, with no average monthly temperatures above 71.6 °F. According to the Köppen Climate Classification system, Maple Creek has a warm-summer Mediterranean climate, abbreviated "Csb" on climate maps.
