= Golden Lakes, Florida =

- unincorporated place
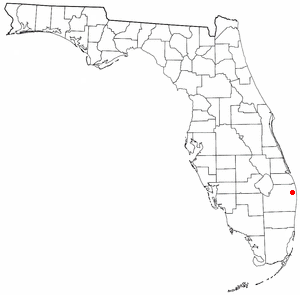
- Location of Golden Lakes, Florida
- Coordinates: 26°42′1″N 80°10′3″W
- Country: United States
- State: Florida
- County: Palm Beach

Area
  - Total: 2.4 sq mi (6.1 km^{2})
  - Land: 2.4 sq mi (6.1 km^{2})
  - Water: 0 sq mi (0.0 km^{2})
- Elevation: 16 ft (5 m)

Population (2000)
  - Total: 6,694
  - Density: 2,831/sq mi (1,093.1/km^{2})
- Time zone: UTC-5 (Eastern (EST))
  - Summer (DST): UTC-4 (EDT)
- Area codes: 561, 728
- FIPS code: 12-26460
- GNIS feature ID: 1867146

Golden Lakes was a former census-designated place (CDP) and current unincorporated place in Palm Beach County, Florida, United States. The population was 6,694 at the 2000 census.

== Geography ==
Golden Lakes is located at 26°42′1″N 80°10′3″W (26.700193, -80.167371).

According to the United States Census Bureau, the CDP has a total area of 6.1 km^{2} (2.4 sq mi), all land.

== Demographics ==
Historical population
Census	Pop.	Note	%±
1990	3,867		—
2000	6,694		73.1%

As of the census of 2000, there were 6,694 people, 3,118 households, and 1,733 families residing in the CDP. The population density was 1,095.2 people/km^{2} (2,837 people/mi^{2}). There were 3,761 housing units at an average density of 615.3 units/km^{2} (1,594 units/mi^{2}). The racial makeup of the CDP was 68.93% White (58.1% Non-Hispanic White), 22.59% African American, 0.40% Native American, 1.18% Asian, 0.04% Pacific Islander, 3.20% from other races, and 3.66% from two or more races. Hispanic or Latino of any race were 16.03% of the population.

In 2000, there were 3,118 households, out of which 22.8% had children under the age of 18 living with them, 38.9% were married couples living together, 12.1% had a female householder with no husband present, and 44.4% were non-families. 38.0% of all households were made up of individuals, and 24.7% had someone living alone who was 65 years of age or older. The average household size was 2.15 and the average family size was 2.79.

In 2000, in the former CDP, the population was spread out, with 22.0% under the age of 18, 10.7% from 18 to 24, 24.0% from 25 to 44, 12.1% from 45 to 64, and 31.1% who were 65 years of age or older. The median age was 38 years. For every 100 females, there were 83.9 males. For every 100 females age 18 and over, there were 80.0 males.

In 2000, the median income for a household in the CDP was $27,674, and the median income for a family was $33,182. Males had a median income of $28,269 versus $25,367 for females. The per capita income for the CDP was $17,818. About 9.9% of families and 13.0% of the population were below the poverty line, including 14.9% of those under age 18 and 10.8% of those age 65 or over.

As of 2000, English as a first language accounted for 77.57% of all residents, while Spanish accounted for 15.49%, French Creole made up 3.11%, Yiddish totaled 1.55%, both Arabic and German were at 0.77%, and Italian was the mother tongue for 0.69% of the population.
