= 1950 Atlantic hurricane season =

- Season summary map

Seasonal boundaries
- First system formed: August 12, 1950
- Last system dissipated: November 12, 1950

Strongest storm
- Name: Dog
  - Maximum winds: 145 mph (230 km/h) (1-minute sustained)
  - Lowest pressure: 943 mbar (hPa; 27.85 inHg)

Seasonal statistics
- Total depressions: 16
- Total storms: 16
- Hurricanes: 11
- Major hurricanes (Cat. 3+): 6
- ACE: 211 (Eighth highest)
- Total fatalities: 93 total
- Total damage: $43.39 million (1950 USD)

Related articles
- 1950 Pacific hurricane season; 1950 Pacific typhoon season; 1950 North Indian Ocean cyclone season

The 1950 Atlantic hurricane season was the first year in the Atlantic hurricane database (HURDAT) that storms were given names in the Atlantic basin. Names were taken from the Joint Army/Navy Phonetic Alphabet, with the first named storm being designated "Able", the second "Baker", and so on. It was a very active season with sixteen tropical storms, with eleven of them developing into hurricanes. Six of these hurricanes were intense enough to be classified as major hurricanes—a denomination reserved for storms that attained sustained winds equivalent to a Category 3 or greater on the present-day Saffir–Simpson scale. One storm, the twelfth of the season, was unnamed and was originally excluded from the yearly summary, and three additional storms were discovered in re-analysis. The large quantity of strong storms during the year yielded, prior to modern reanalysis, what was the highest seasonal accumulated cyclone energy (ACE) of the 20th century in the Atlantic basin; 1950 held the seasonal ACE record until broken by the 1995 Atlantic hurricane season. However, later examination by researchers determined that several storms in the 1950 season were weaker than thought, leading to a lower ACE than assessed originally. This season also set the record for the most tropical storms, eight, in the month of October.

The tropical cyclones of the season produced a total of 88 fatalities and $38.5 million in property damage (1950 USD). The first officially named Atlantic hurricane was Hurricane Able, which formed on August 12, brushed the North Carolina coastline, and later moved across Atlantic Canada. The strongest hurricane of the season, Hurricane Dog, reached the equivalent of a Category 4 hurricane on the Saffir–Simpson scale and caused extensive damage to the Leeward Islands. Two major hurricanes affected Florida: Easy produced the highest 24-hour rainfall total recorded in the United States, while King struck downtown Miami as a Category 4 hurricane and caused $27.75 million (1950 USD) of damage. The two major landfalls made the 1945–1950 period the only five-year period to feature five major hurricane landfalls in the United States—a record that held until tied in 2000–2005. The last storm of the year, an unnamed tropical storm, dissipated on November 12.

== Seasonal summary ==
Most intense Atlantic hurricane seasons (since 1850) (Note: There is an undercount bias of zero to six tropical cyclones per year between 1851 and 1885 and zero to four per year between 1886 and 1910, due to the lack of modern observation techniques, see Tropical cyclone observation. This may have led to significantly lower ACE ratings for hurricane seasons prior to 1910.)
Rank	Season	ACE value
1	1933	258.6
2	2005	245.3
3	1893	231.1
4	1926	229.6
5	1995	227.1
6	2004	226.9
7	2017	224.9
8	1950	211.3
9	1961	188.9
10	1998	181.8
(source)

The season officially began on June 15 and ended on November 15; these dates conventionally delimit the period of each year when most tropical cyclones form in the Atlantic basin. This season was the first time that the United States Weather Bureau operated with radar technology to observe hurricanes 200 mi (320 km) away from land. Although the season began on June 15, tropical activity typically does not begin before August. The tropics remained tranquil through early August, and the U.S. Weather Bureau noted that the season had been "remarkably quiet". The inactive period ended on August 12, when the first tropical storm developed east of the Lesser Antilles. This storm received the name "Able" as part of the Joint Army/Navy Phonetic Alphabet. (The same alphabet was also used in the 1951 and 1952 seasons, before being replaced by female naming in 1953.)

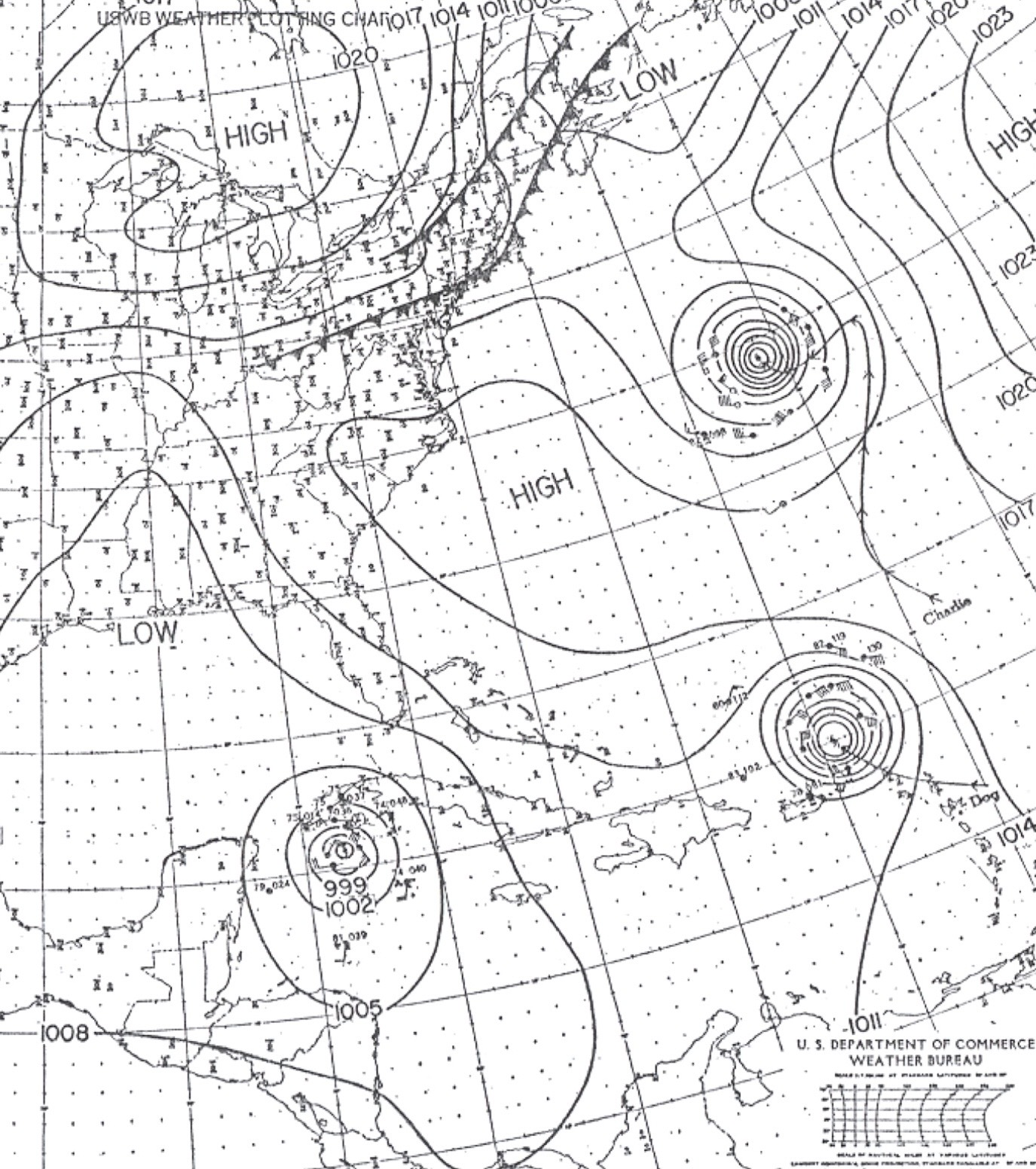
Weather map on September 2, showing, Hurricanes Charlie, Dog, and Easy active simultaneously in the Atlantic basin

Before the end of August, four hurricanes had formed in the Atlantic, two of which attained major hurricane status. A major hurricane is a tropical cyclone with winds of at least 111 mph (179 km/h); a storm of this intensity would be classified as a Category 3 or greater on the Saffir-Simpson Hurricane Scale introduced in the 1970s. In contrast to the busy August, only three named storms developed in September—although three of the August hurricanes lasted into September. Hurricane Dog became the strongest hurricane of the season on September 6 with winds of 145 mph (233 km/h); its peak strength occurred over the open Atlantic Ocean, so it did not cause significant damage when it was at its strongest. It was among the most severe hurricanes on record in Antigua, where the hurricane struck early in its duration. Eight tropical storms or hurricanes formed in October, which is greater than in any other year.

In total, there were sixteen tropical storms during the season, of which five (Tropical Storm How, Tropical Storm Mike and three unnamed tropical storms) did not attain hurricane status. Overall, six major hurricanes occurred during the year. The Hurricane Hunters made about 300 flights into hurricanes during the season, the most since the practice began in 1943. The number of storms was above average; in a typical year, eleven tropical storms, six hurricanes, and between two and three major hurricanes take place. With the numerous major hurricanes, the season produced a high accumulated cyclone energy (ACE) of 211, although it was originally assessed as 243 before reanalysis. At one point, the 1950 total was the highest on record, before being surpassed by the 2005 season. This value is an approximation of the combined kinetic energy used by all tropical cyclones throughout the season.

== Systems ==
=== Hurricane Able ===
- Category 3 hurricane (SSHWS)
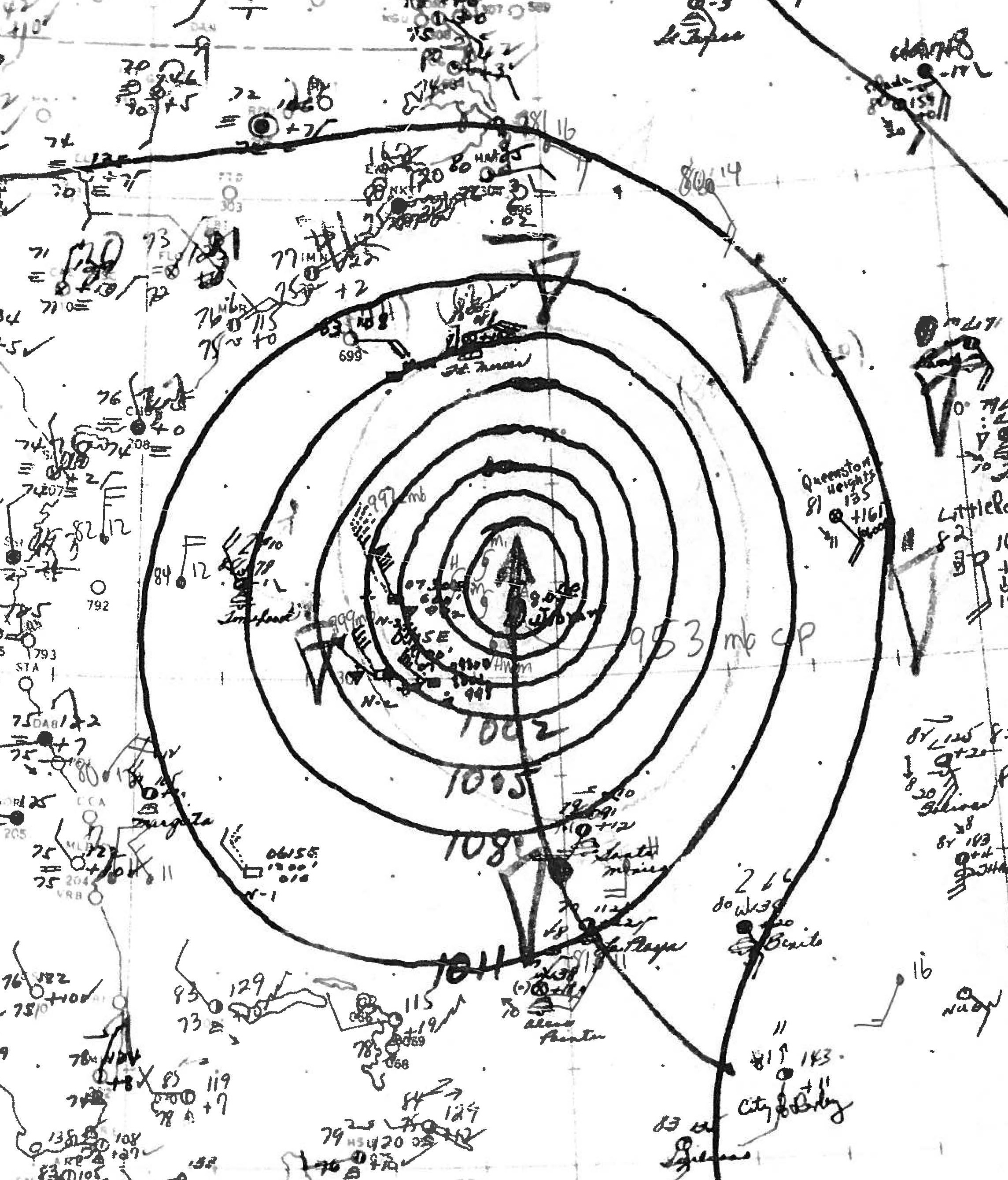
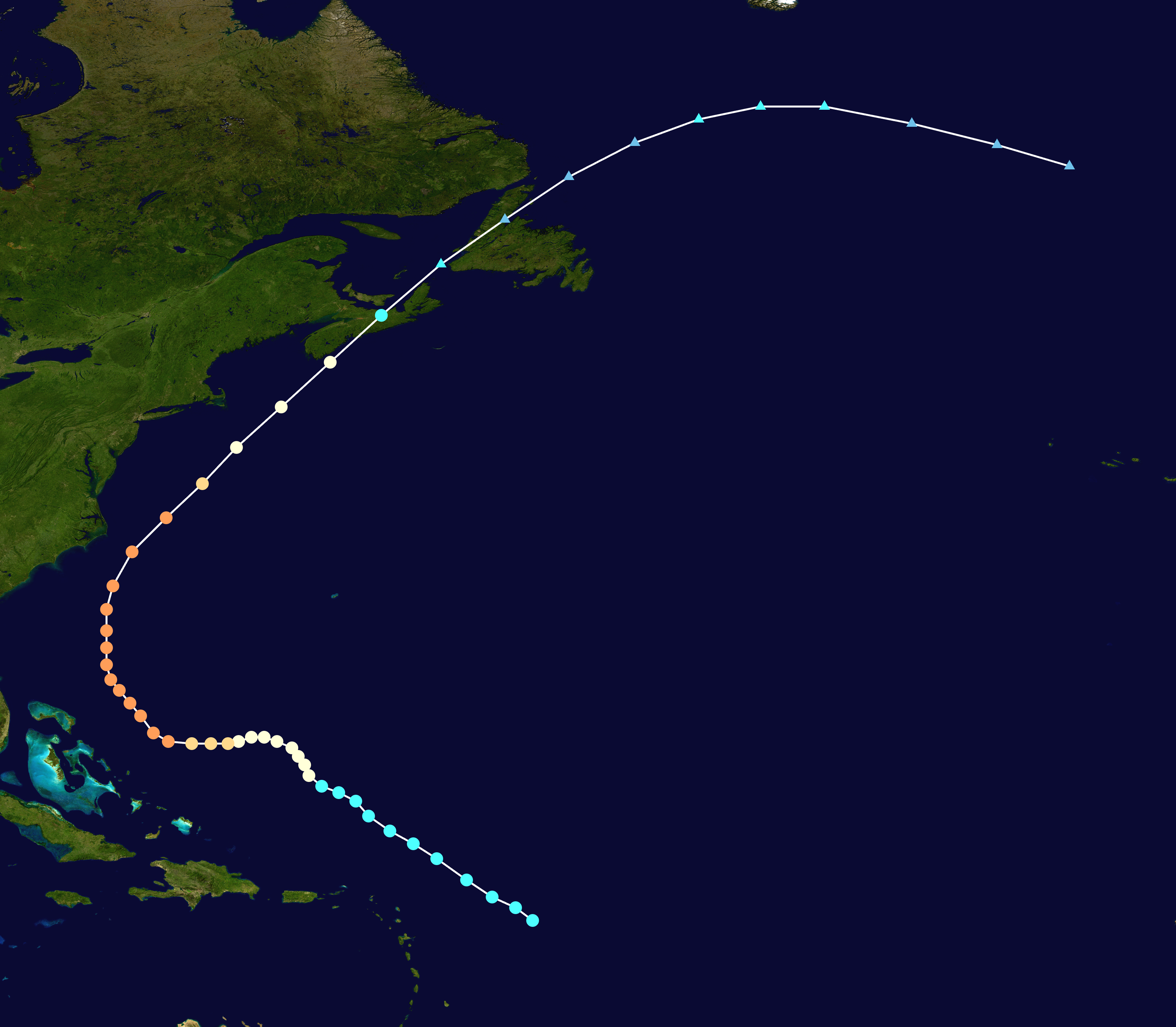
- Duration: August 12 – August 22
- Peak intensity: 125 mph (205 km/h) (1-min); ≤953 mbar (hPa)

The beginning of the season was considered "remarkably quiet" by the U.S. Weather Bureau, with no noteworthy activity until early August. A Hurricane Hunters flight into an easterly wave on August 12 indicated a developing tropical storm east of the Lesser Antilles; it was later given the name "Able", which is the first name in the Joint Army/Navy Phonetic Alphabet. It moved steadily northwestward and reached hurricane status on August 14, as it passed to the north of the Leeward Islands. The next day, Hurricane Able turned to the west and west-southwest, due to a high pressure system to its north. On August 17 it attained major hurricane status, and by early on August 18 reconnaissance aircraft measured winds of 140 mph (225 km/h), though Atlantic hurricane reanalysis later determined that those winds were unrepresentative of the intensity. At the time, the storm was 350 miles (565 km) in diameter. On August 19, Able turned to the north, and attained its peak intensity of 125 mph (201 km/h) while doing so; shortly before peak intensity, aircraft measured a central pressure of 953 millibars (28.14 inHg), the lowest in the life of the storm. The next day Able accelerated to the northeast, after passing just offshore Cape Hatteras, North Carolina. Having maintained peak winds for 12 hours, Hurricane Able began to weaken on August 20, and early the next day it moved quickly by Cape Cod. It produced winds of hurricane force in Nova Scotia before it moved ashore on August 21 near Goodwood with winds of 75 mph (121 km/h). Subsequently, it deteriorated into an extratropical cyclone, and Able crossed Newfoundland before dissipating early on August 24 in the far northern Atlantic Ocean.

Along the coast of North Carolina, the hurricane produced light winds and rough waves, as well as moderate precipitation. Heavier rainfall occurred in southern New England, peaking at 6.89 inches (175 mm) in Beechwood, Massachusetts. Flooding was reported in portions of New York City. The resulting slick roads from the rains caused nine traffic fatalities across New England. The storm produced 55 mph (90 km/h) gusts in Nantucket and Cape Cod, along with high tides and waves. Offshore, the waves damaged a freighter headed for Florida. In Nova Scotia, Able produced hurricane-force winds, the only land along its path to receive such winds; a gust of 99 mph (160 km/h) was reported in Halifax. The hurricane also dropped heavy rainfall, including over 4.92 inches (125 mm) in Annapolis Valley. Initially there were three fishing boats missing throughout the region, although two later returned to harbor. By August 22, the third was still missing over the Grand Banks, which prompted a rescue team to search for the boat. Many other boats crashed against the coast, and two children died when their raft capsized. Two bridges and several roadways were washed out or flooded, and in Charlottetown, Prince Edward Island, floodwaters left roadways impassable. In Canada, the hurricane left more than CA$1 million, half of which in Annapolis Valley, and split between crops, communications, and fishing industries.

=== Hurricane Baker ===
- Category 2 hurricane (SSHWS)
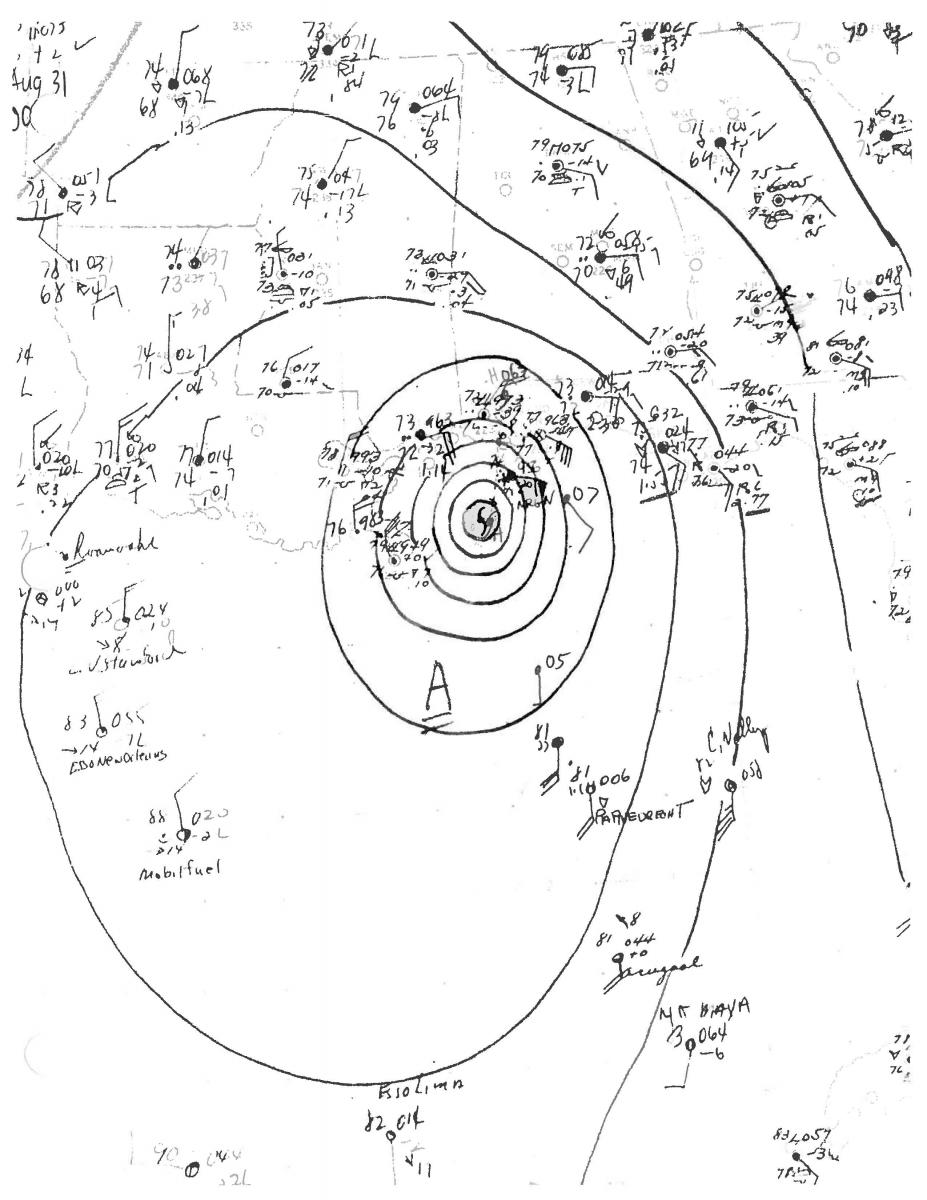
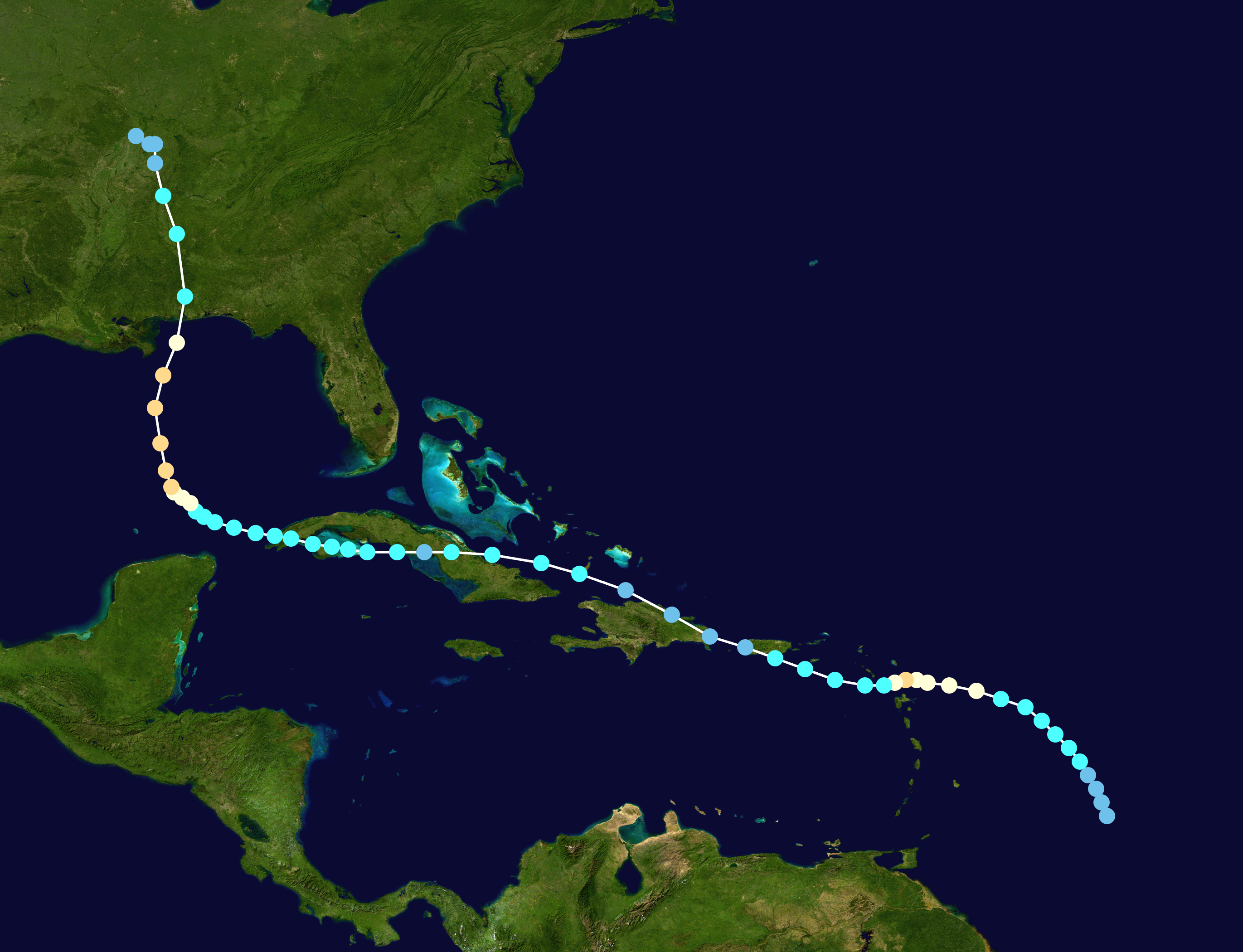
- Duration: August 18 – September 1
- Peak intensity: 105 mph (165 km/h) (1-min); ≤978 mbar (hPa)

A tropical wave exited western Africa on August 13, which developed into Tropical Storm Baker east of the Lesser Antilles on August 18. It moved northwestward and later turned to the west, attaining hurricane status on August 21. The next day, the hurricane attained Category 2 intensity just as it crossed over Antigua, where heavy damage was reported. More than 100 homes were damaged or destroyed, which left thousands homeless. Afterward, the hurricane began to weaken, and later on August 22 its winds decreased to tropical storm status. The cyclone then struck Montserrat as a strong tropical storm. The next day it struck southwestern Puerto Rico, and shortly thereafter weakened into a tropical depression, passing over the Dominican Republic. Baker turned more to the west, re-attaining tropical storm status before striking eastern Cuba on August 24. In Cuba, 37 people died, and the property losses reached several million dollars.

On August 25, Baker weakened to tropical depression status while crossing Cuba, but soon thereafter regained tropical storm intensity in the western Caribbean Sea. Two days later, Baker entered the Gulf of Mexico, and by the next day Baker had regained hurricane status. It turned northward, reaching a peak intensity of 105 mph (169 km/h) on August 30. Baker weakened slightly before making landfall near Gulf Shores, Alabama with winds of 85 mph (137 km/h) on August 31. Property and crop damage totaled $2.55 million (1950 USD), primarily between Mobile, Alabama and Saint Marks, Florida. Torrential rainfall fell throughout the region, with the largest total occurring in Caryville, Florida, where 15.49 in (393 mm) of precipitation were recorded. The heavy precipitation was responsible for extensive crop damage across the region. The hurricane also spawned two tornadoes, one of which destroyed four houses and a building in Apalachicola, Florida. In Birmingham, Alabama, high wind downed power lines, which caused one death and two injuries due to live wires. While inland, Baker tracked northwestward and eventually dissipated over southeastern Missouri on September 1.

=== Hurricane Charlie ===
- Category 2 hurricane (SSHWS)
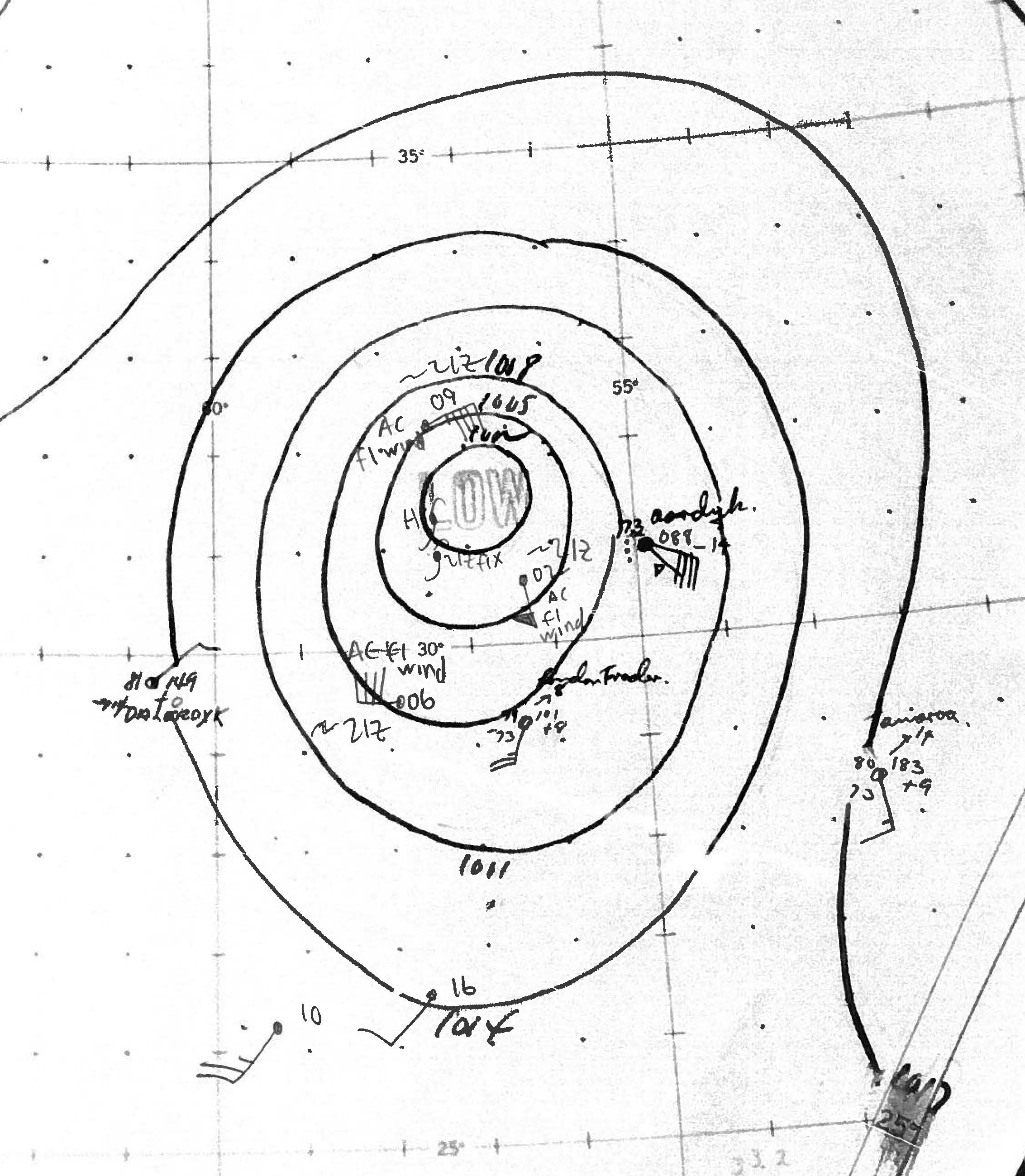
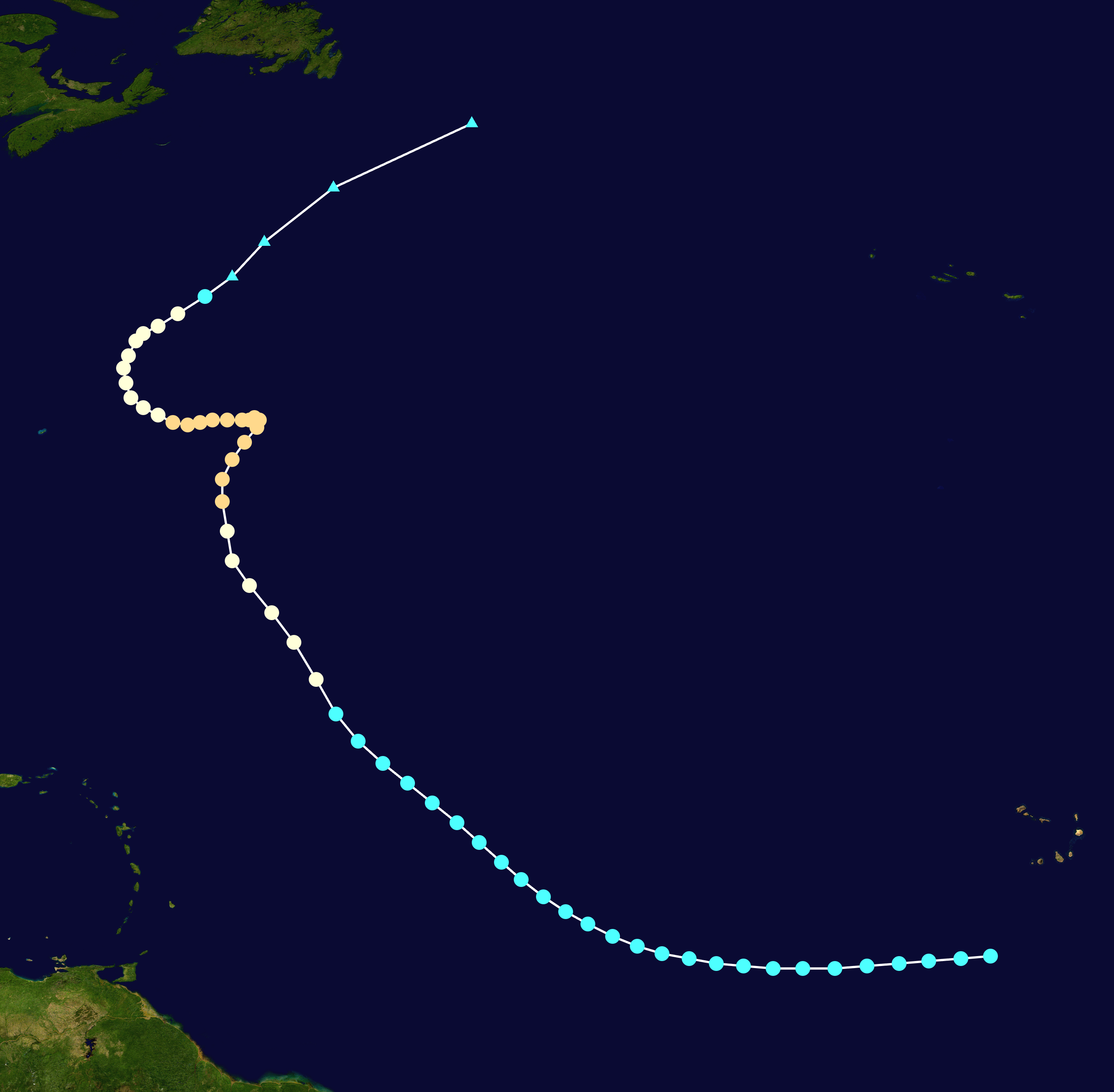
- Duration: August 21 – September 5
- Peak intensity: 110 mph (175 km/h) (1-min); ≤974 mbar (hPa)

Hurricane Charlie developed on August 21 to the southwest of the Cape Verde islands. At the time, the Weather Bureau did not consider Charlie to be a tropical cyclone until almost a week later. For four days, the storm tracked generally to the west as a weak tropical storm. On August 25, it turned to the northwest and intensified, becoming a hurricane on August 28. On August 30, Charlie attained peak winds of 110 mph (180 km/h), although the Hurricane Hunters estimated higher winds. At the time, the hurricane was stalled to the east-southeast of Bermuda, and subsequently turned to a westward drift. On September 2, Charlie turned to the north and northeast. At the time, it co-existed with two other hurricanes, Dog and Easy; it is a rare occurrence for three hurricanes to exist simultaneously in the Atlantic. Charlie slowly weakened and lost tropical characteristics, and by September 5 Charlie had transitioned into an extratropical cyclone about 480 mi (770 km) southeast of Halifax, Nova Scotia. It dissipated later on September 5 without having affected land.

=== Hurricane Dog ===
- Category 4 hurricane (SSHWS)
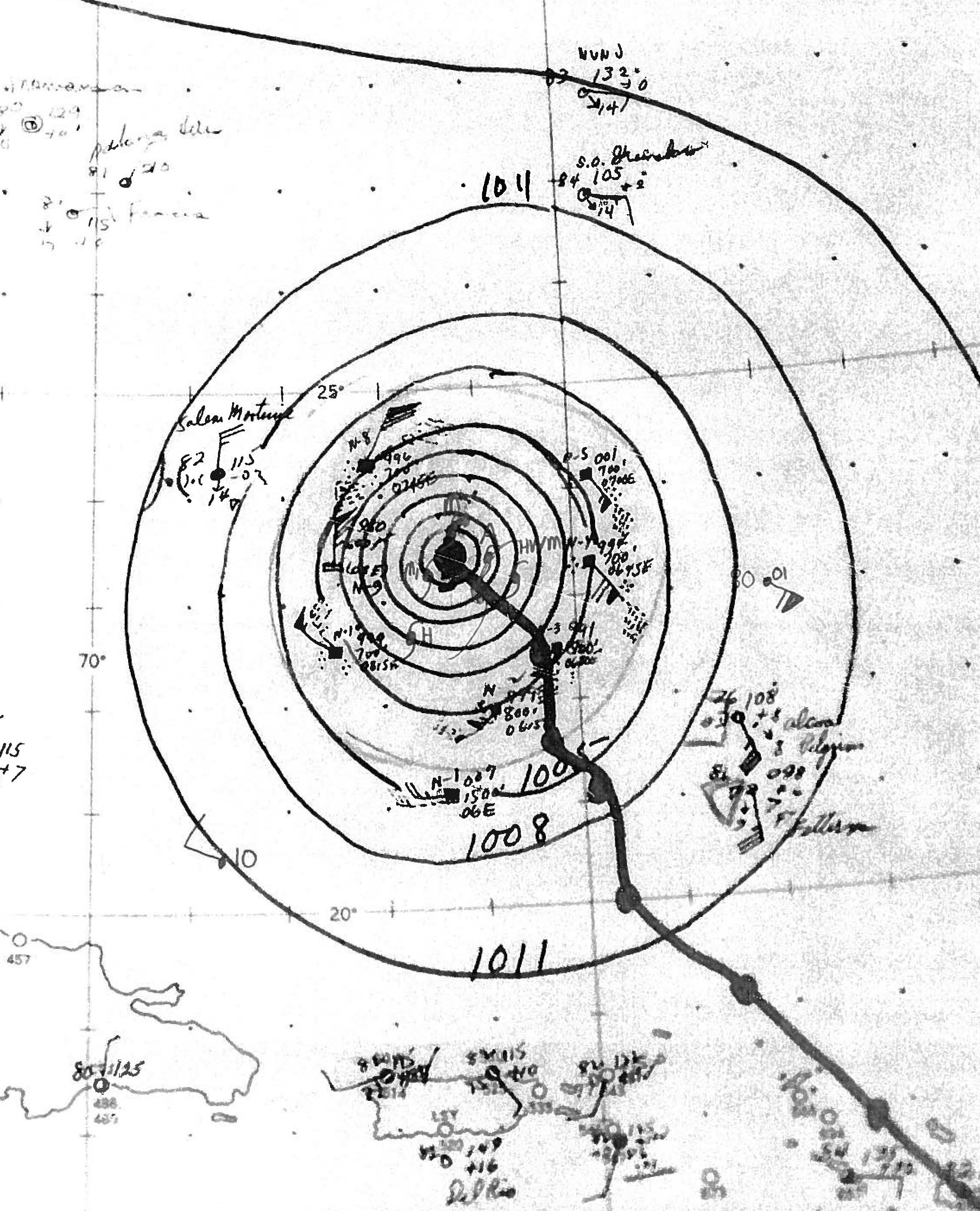
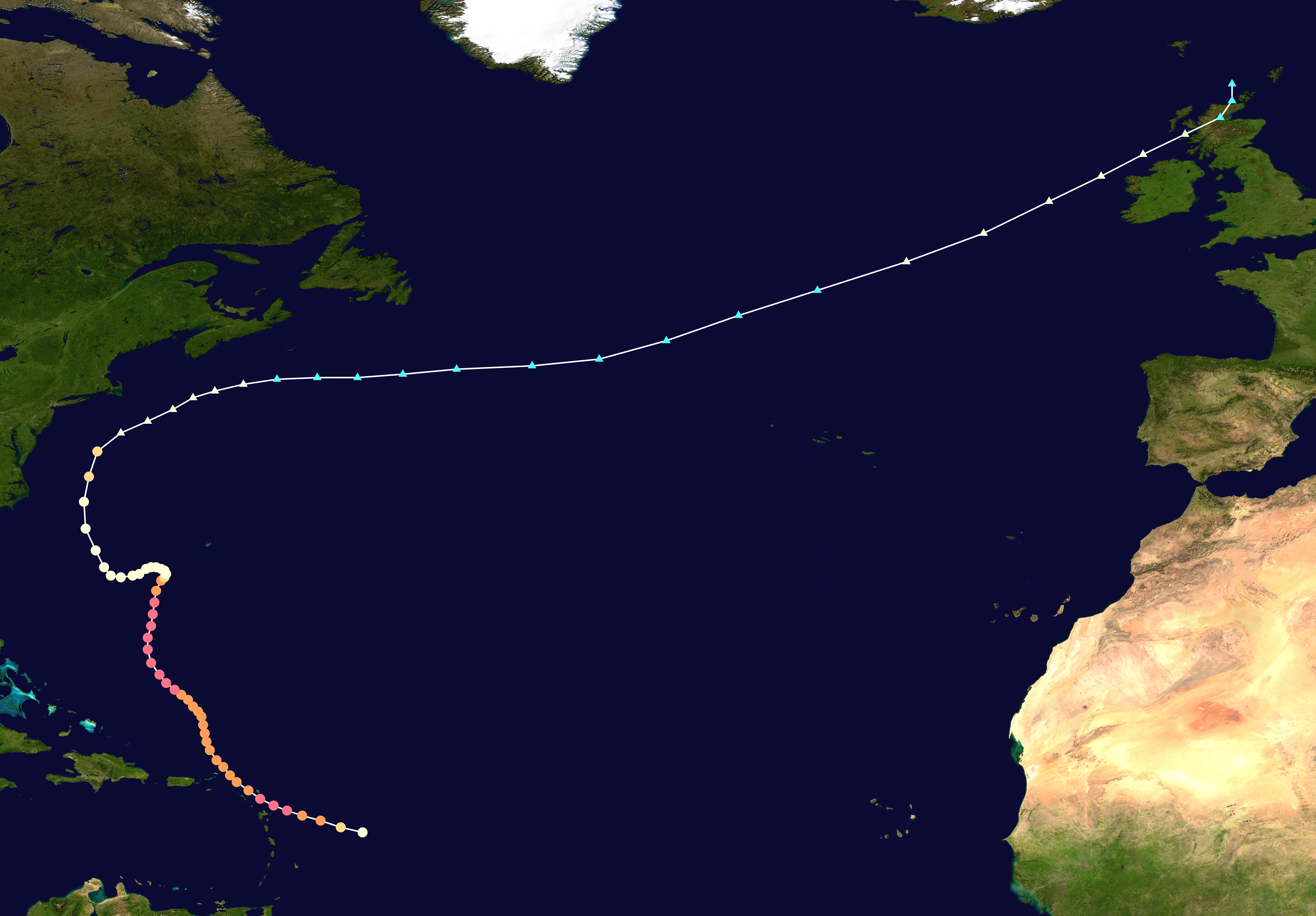
- Duration: August 30 – September 12
- Peak intensity: 145 mph (230 km/h) (1-min); ≤943 mbar (hPa)

Hurricane Dog is believed to have developed from a tropical wave that left the coast of Africa on August 24. Its first observation as a tropical cyclone occurred on August 30, when it was a 90 mph (140 km/h) hurricane; the storm is believed to have begun farther east as a Cape Verde-type hurricane, but was not detectable before August 30. At the time, Dog was located east of the Lesser Antilles, and it quickly attained major hurricane status as it moved to the west-northwest. Dog passed through the Lesser Antilles with winds of 130 mph (210 km/h). It was considered among the worst hurricanes in the history of Antigua, where thousands were left homeless. Damage was estimated at $1 million (1950 USD, 13.4 million 2026 USD), and there were two deaths from drowning in the region.

After passing through the Leeward Islands, the hurricane turned to a northerly drift with continued intensification. On September 5, it attained wind speeds that would be equivalent to a Category 4 hurricane on the present-day Saffir-Simpson scale, with sustained winds of 145 mph (233 km/h). Operationally, the wind intensity value was estimated by Hurricane Hunters at 185 mph (298 km/h) when the hurricane was located about 450 mi (720 km) south-southwest of Bermuda; this estimate is now believed to have been an overestimation of the peak winds in Hurricane Dog, though the storm produced enormous wave heights at sea.

Maintaining peak intensity for about 18 hours, Dog began a weakening trend as it made a sharp turn to the west. It accelerated to the north on September 10, and two days later Dog passed within 200 mi (320 km) of Cape Cod. Newspapers attributed heavy rainfall in the Mid-Atlantic states—which resulted in five deaths—to the hurricane. Further north, the hurricane killed 12 people in New England, and produced a total of $2 million (1950 USD, 26.8 million 2026 USD) of property damage. Twelve others died in two shipwrecks off the coast of Canada. The hurricane later became a strong extratropical cyclone, maintaining hurricane-force winds while passing south of Nova Scotia and eventually hitting Scotland with hurricane-force gusts on September 18.

=== Hurricane Easy ===
- Category 3 hurricane (SSHWS)
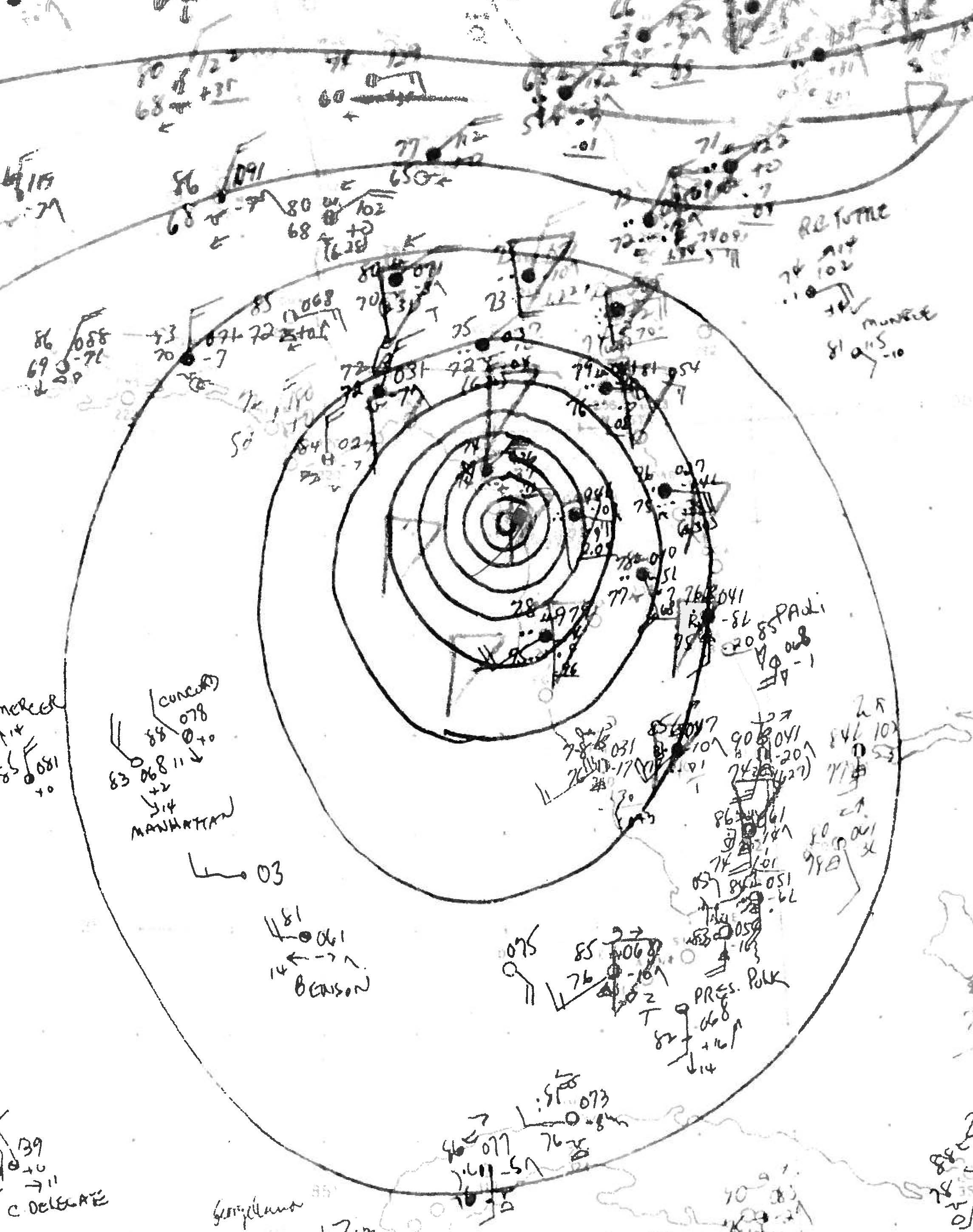
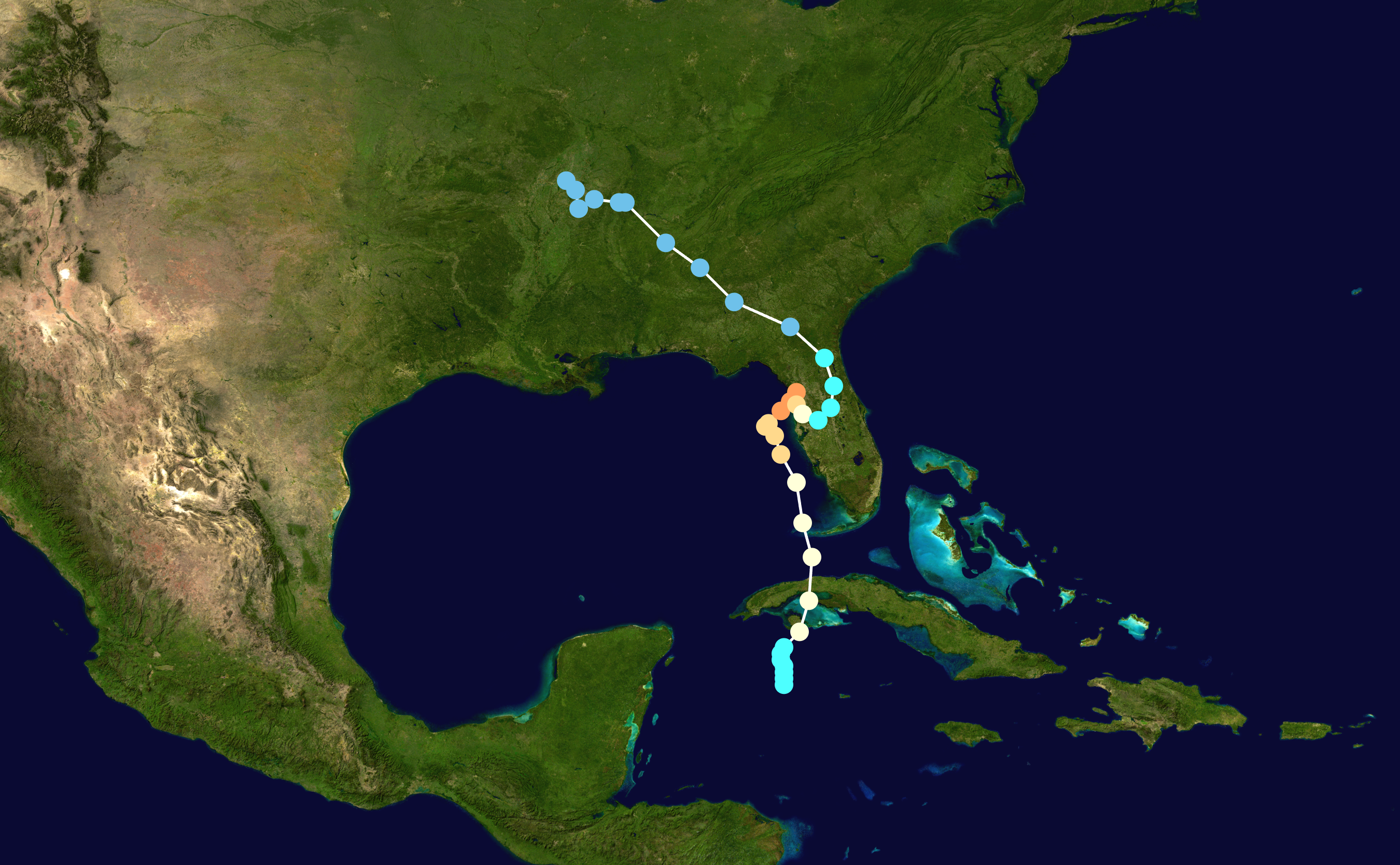
- Duration: September 1 – September 9
- Peak intensity: 120 mph (195 km/h) (1-min); ≤958 mbar (hPa)

Hurricane Easy developed on September 1 from a trough in the western Caribbean, which persisted after Hurricane Baker moved through the region in late August. Moving northeastward, the hurricane crossed Cuba on September 3 and entered the Gulf of Mexico. Easy turned to the northwest and strengthened to its peak intensity as a Category 3 hurricane. At the time, Easy was located just off the west coast of Florida; however, a ridge to its north caused the hurricane to stall, execute a small loop, and make landfall near Cedar Key. Following the landfall, Easy moved offshore, turned to the southeast, and made a second landfall near Hernando Beach on September 6. The hurricane turned northwestward over the Florida Peninsula, and gradually weakened as it moved into Georgia and the southeastern United States. On September 9, Easy dissipated over northeastern Arkansas.

Damage in Cuba was minor, although large portions of western Florida experienced hurricane-force winds and heavy rainfall. Yankeetown reported 38.70 in (983 mm) of precipitation in 24 hours, which at the time was the largest 24-hour rainfall total on record in the United States. The cumulative total rainfall on Yankeetown from Easy was 45.20 in (1,148 mm), which still retains the record for the wettest tropical cyclone in Florida. Damage was heaviest in Cedar Key, where half of the houses were destroyed and most of the remaining were damaged. The rainfall caused heavy crop damage in the region. Across the state, Easy caused $3 million in damage (1950 USD), the total was less than expected, due to the sparse population of the affected area. Additionally, the hurricane was indirectly responsible for two deaths by electrocution. At the time, Easy was also known as the "Cedar Keys Hurricane".

=== Hurricane Fox ===
- Category 4 hurricane (SSHWS)
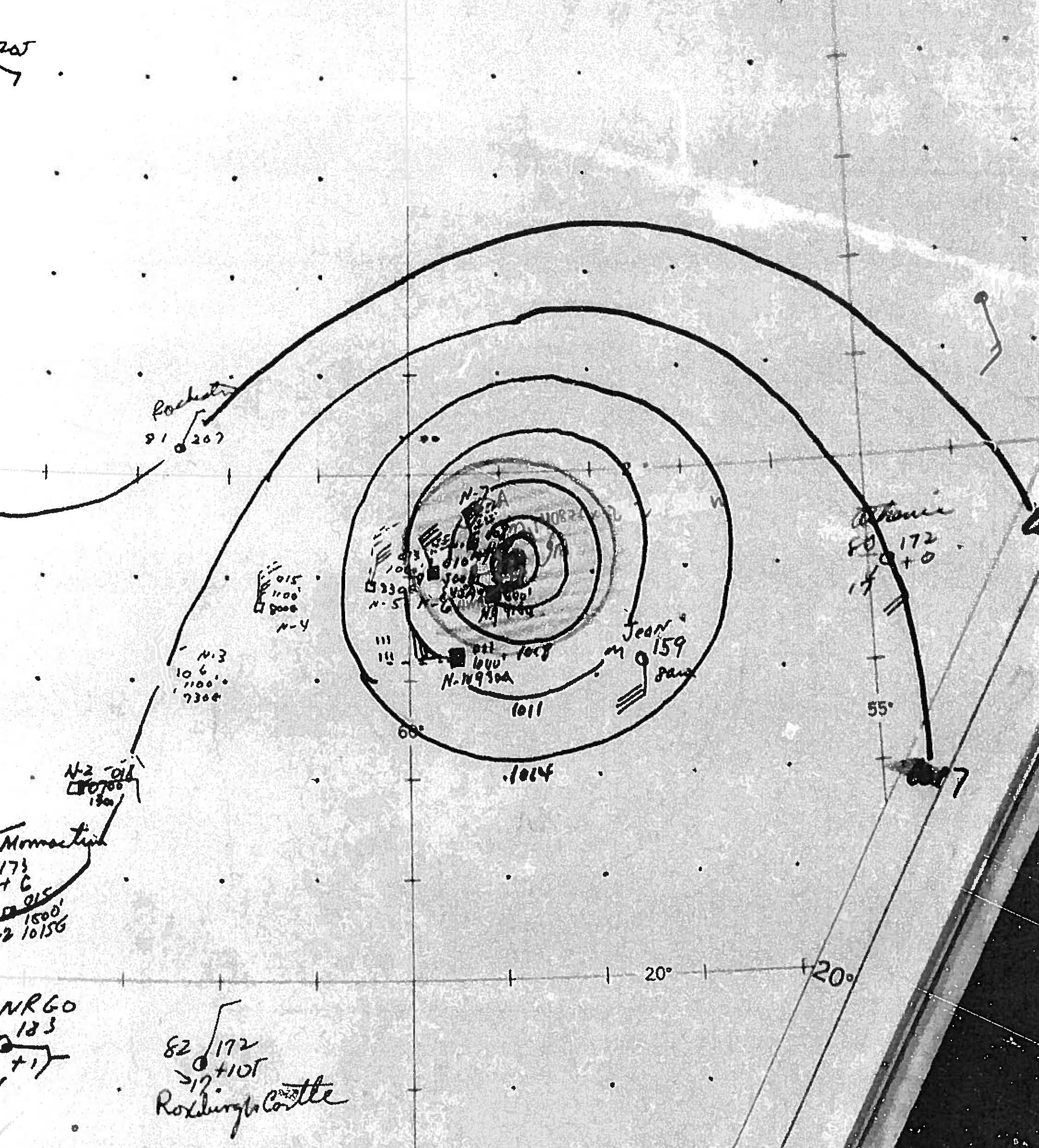
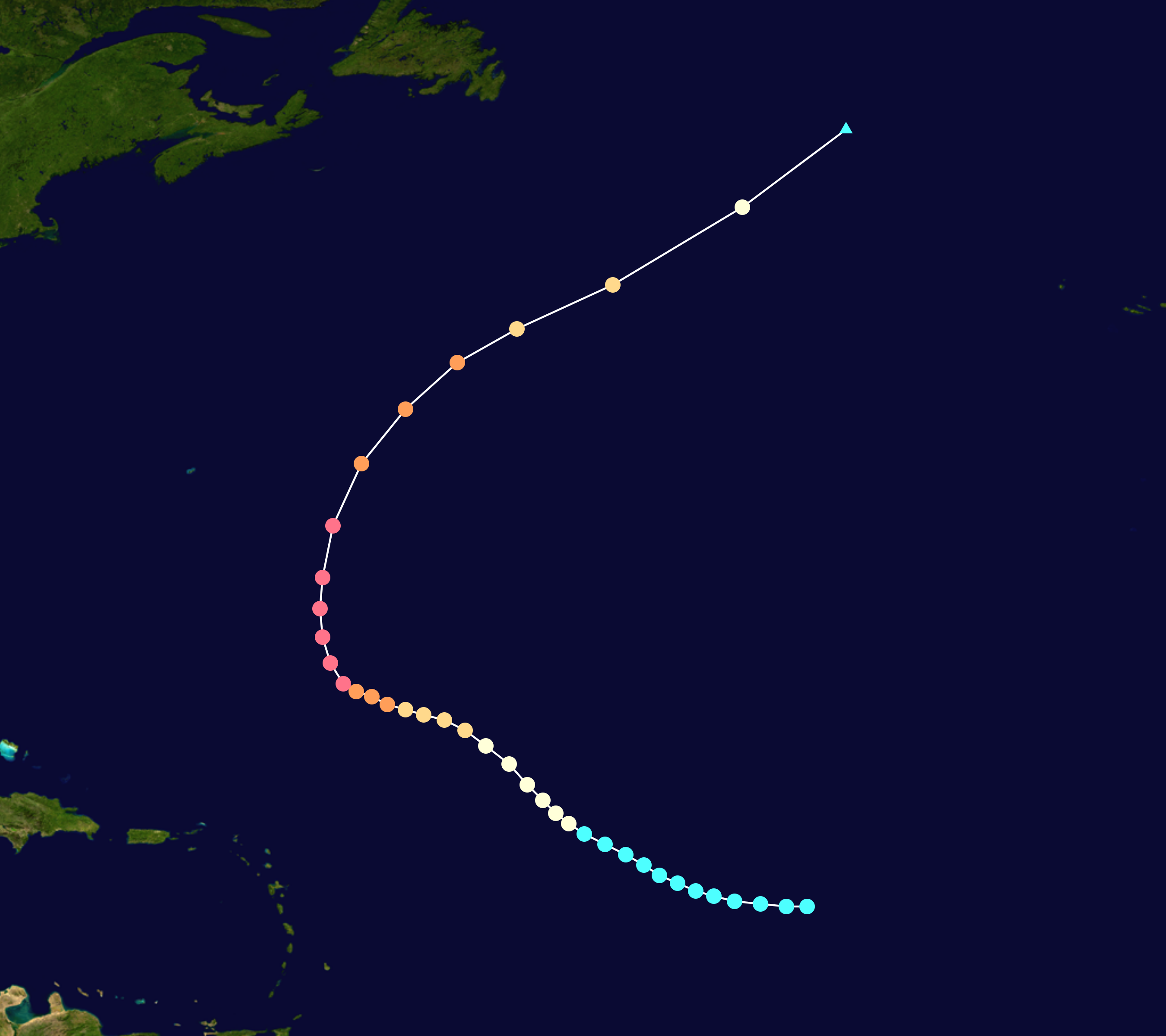
- Duration: September 8 – September 17
- Peak intensity: 140 mph (220 km/h) (1-min); 946 mbar (hPa)

On September 8, Tropical Storm Fox was present in the open Atlantic Ocean between the Lesser Antilles and Cape Verde, likely originating from a tropical wave. Hurricane Fox was first discovered by Hurricane Hunters on September 10, when it was located about 1,000 mi (1,600 km) east of Puerto Rico. A small system, the hurricane moved generally northwestward and gradually intensified. After turning toward the north, Fox reached its peak intensity with maximum sustained winds of 140 mph (230 km/h) on September 14, as it passed about 300 mi (480 km) east of Bermuda. Following its peak intensity, the hurricane accelerated to the north and northeast. By September 17, Fox had lost all tropical characteristics, and later that day the circulation dissipated about halfway between the Azores and Newfoundland. Fox never affected land along its path. When Fox dissipated, it was the first time in 36 days without an active tropical cyclone in the Atlantic Ocean.

=== Hurricane George ===
- Category 2 hurricane (SSHWS)
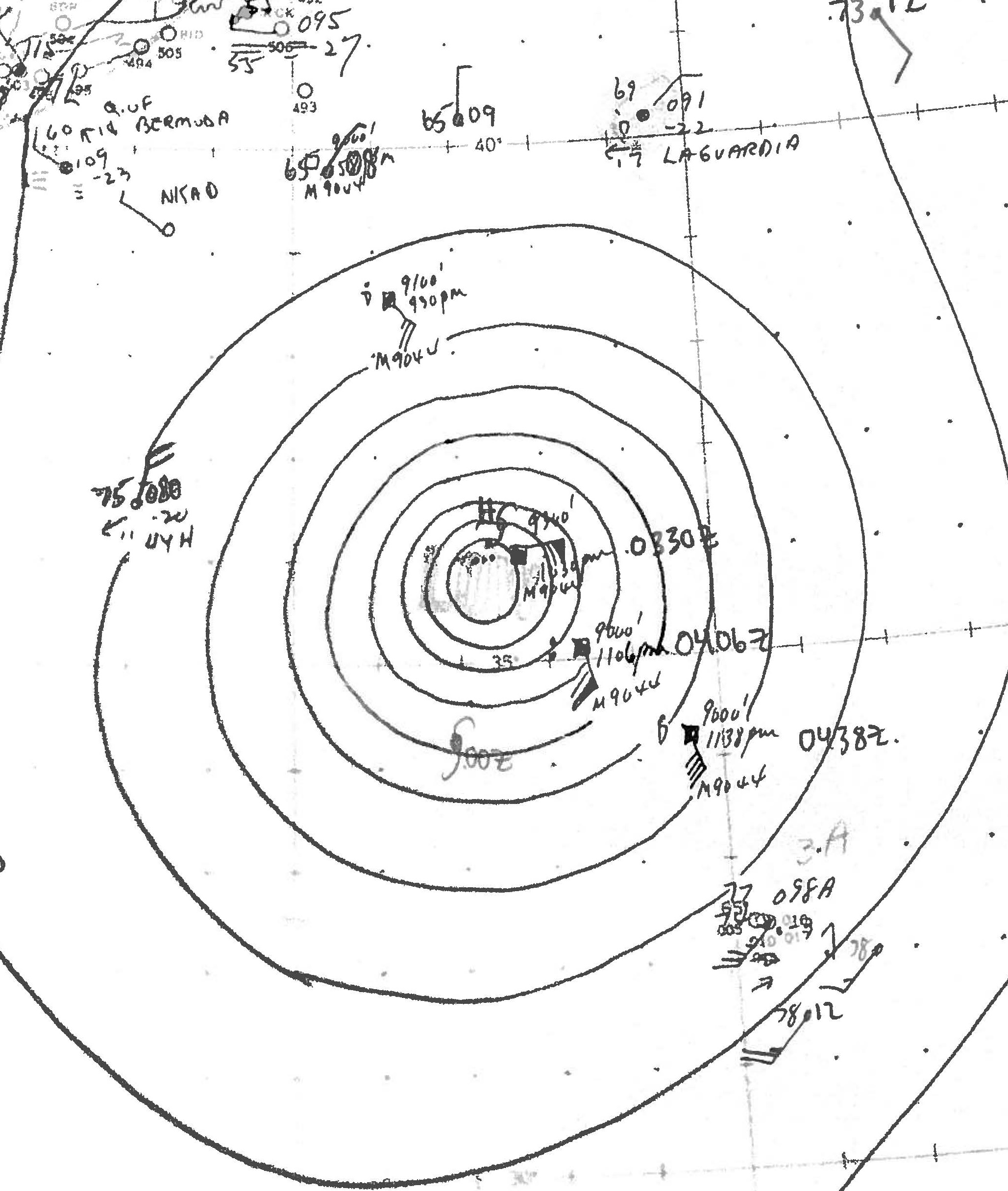
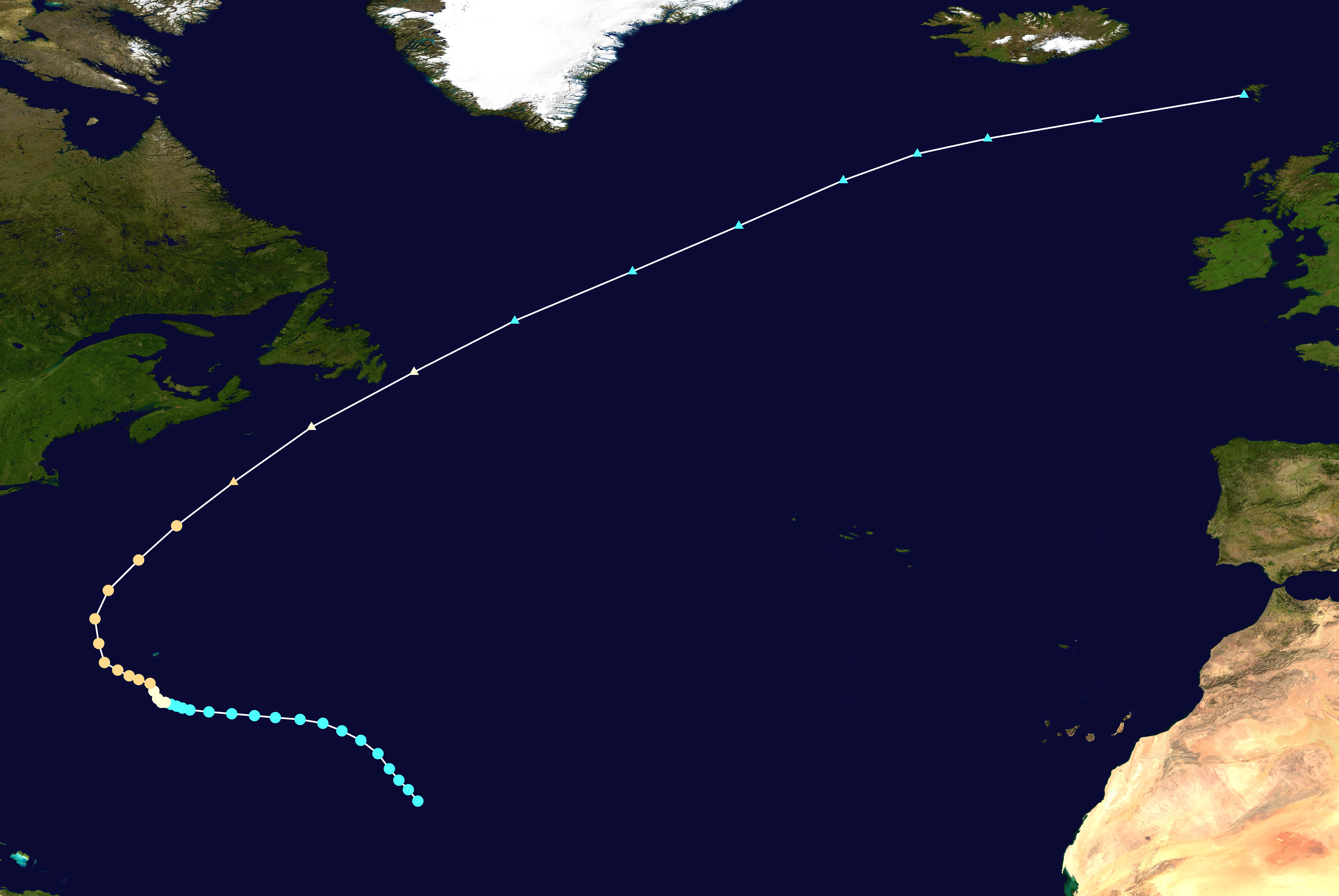
- Duration: September 27 – October 5
- Peak intensity: 110 mph (175 km/h) (1-min); 960 mbar (hPa)

Tropical Storm George originated on September 27 from a strong tropical wave northeast of the Lesser Antilles and southeast of Bermuda. A large system, it moved to the northwest and later west-northwest. George began strengthening on September 30 as it decreased its forward speed. The next day, while remaining nearly stationary south of Bermuda, a nearby ship reported that George had reached hurricane status. It continued moving very slowly, passing only 100 mi (160 km) south of Bermuda. The island experienced winds of 30 to 40 mph (48 to 64 km/h). Aside from rainbands, little impact was reported on Bermuda.

The hurricane passed west of Bermuda on October 3. A day later, George reached its maximum intensity, attaining sustained winds of 110 mph (180 km/h); in its small eye, an Air Force Hurricane Hunter plane measured a central pressure of 960 mb (28.35 inHg). It accelerated to the north and later to the northeast, and on October 5 George transitioned into an extratropical cyclone. Shortly thereafter, it passed just south of Newfoundland, and on October 7 the remnants of George dissipated south of Iceland.

=== Tropical Storm How ===
- Tropical storm (SSHWS)
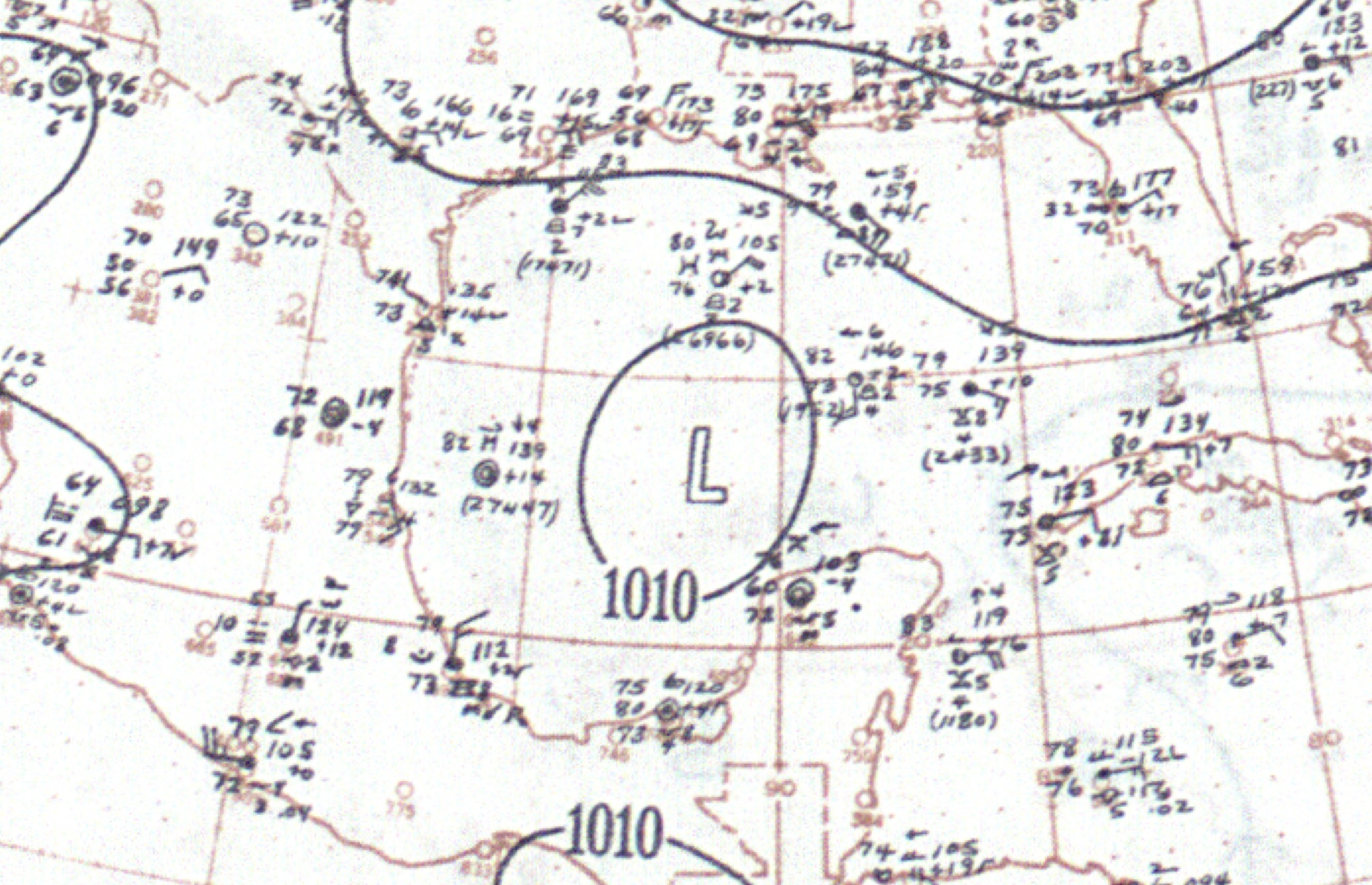
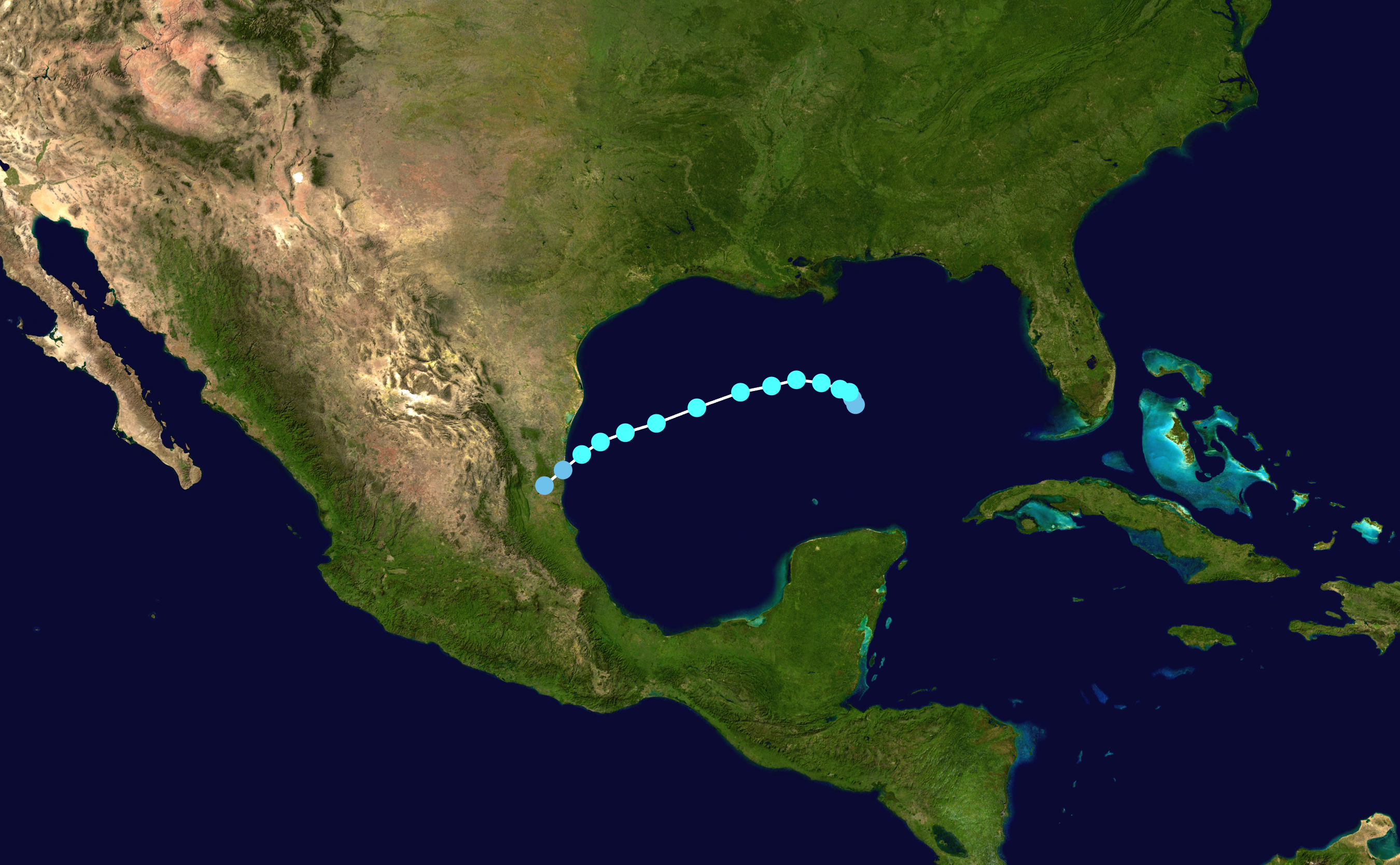
- Duration: October 1 – October 4
- Peak intensity: 45 mph (75 km/h) (1-min); ≤1007 mbar (hPa)

A weak trough existed in the eastern Gulf of Mexico on September 29. A circulation developed within the storm, becoming a tropical depression on October 1. Later that day, the system intensified into Tropical Storm How. Initially, the tropical storm moved west-northwestward and its sustained winds peaked by October 2, estimated at 45 mph (72 km/h). Officials advised small boats to remain at port along the Louisiana coast due to the storm. On October 3, Tropical Storm How turned toward the southwest as it began weakening, and the next day it moved ashore near La Pesca, Tamaulipas as a tropical depression. About six hours after making landfall, How dissipated over the Sierra Madre Oriental in northeastern Mexico.

=== Hurricane Item ===
- Category 2 hurricane (SSHWS)
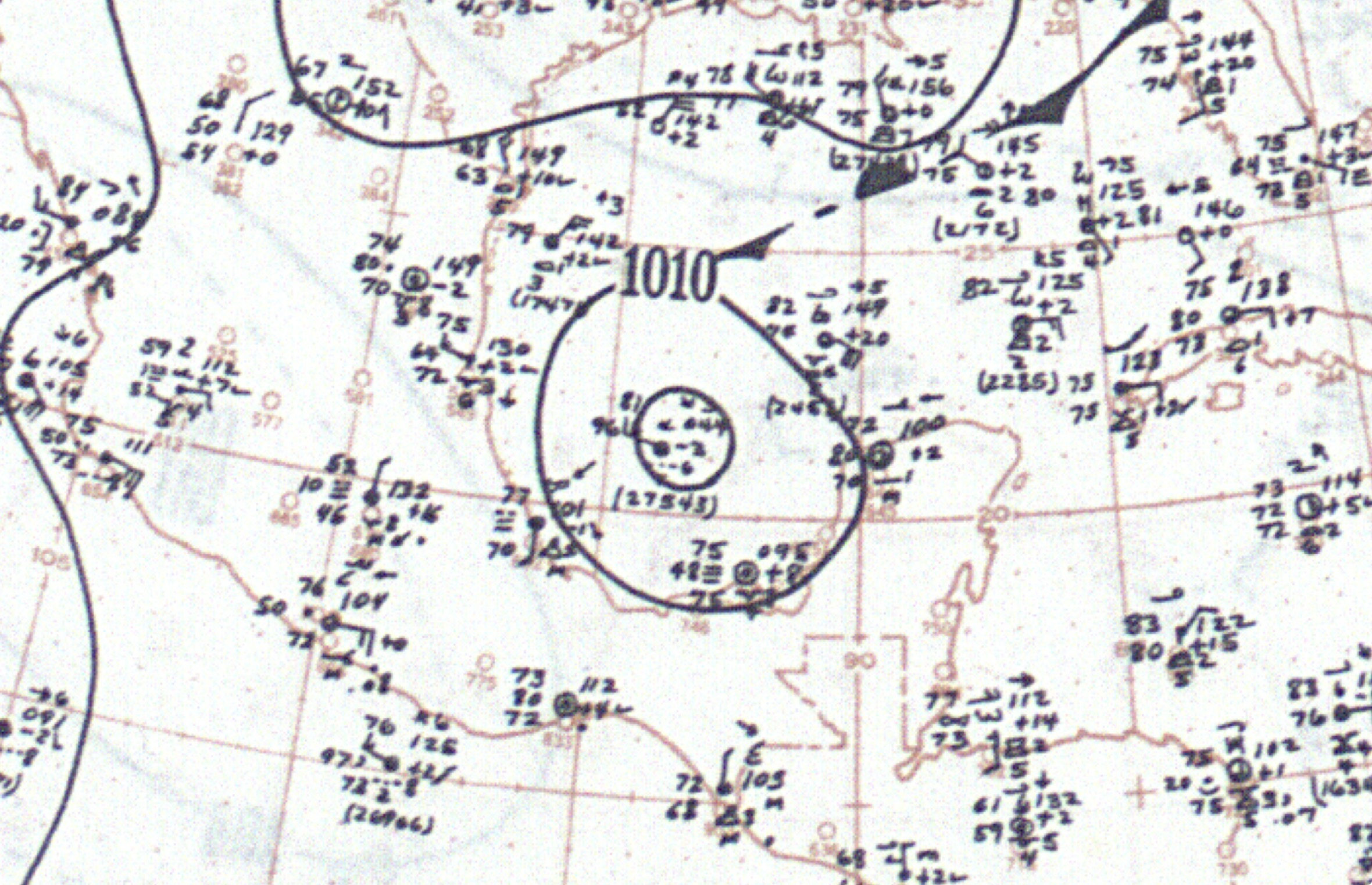
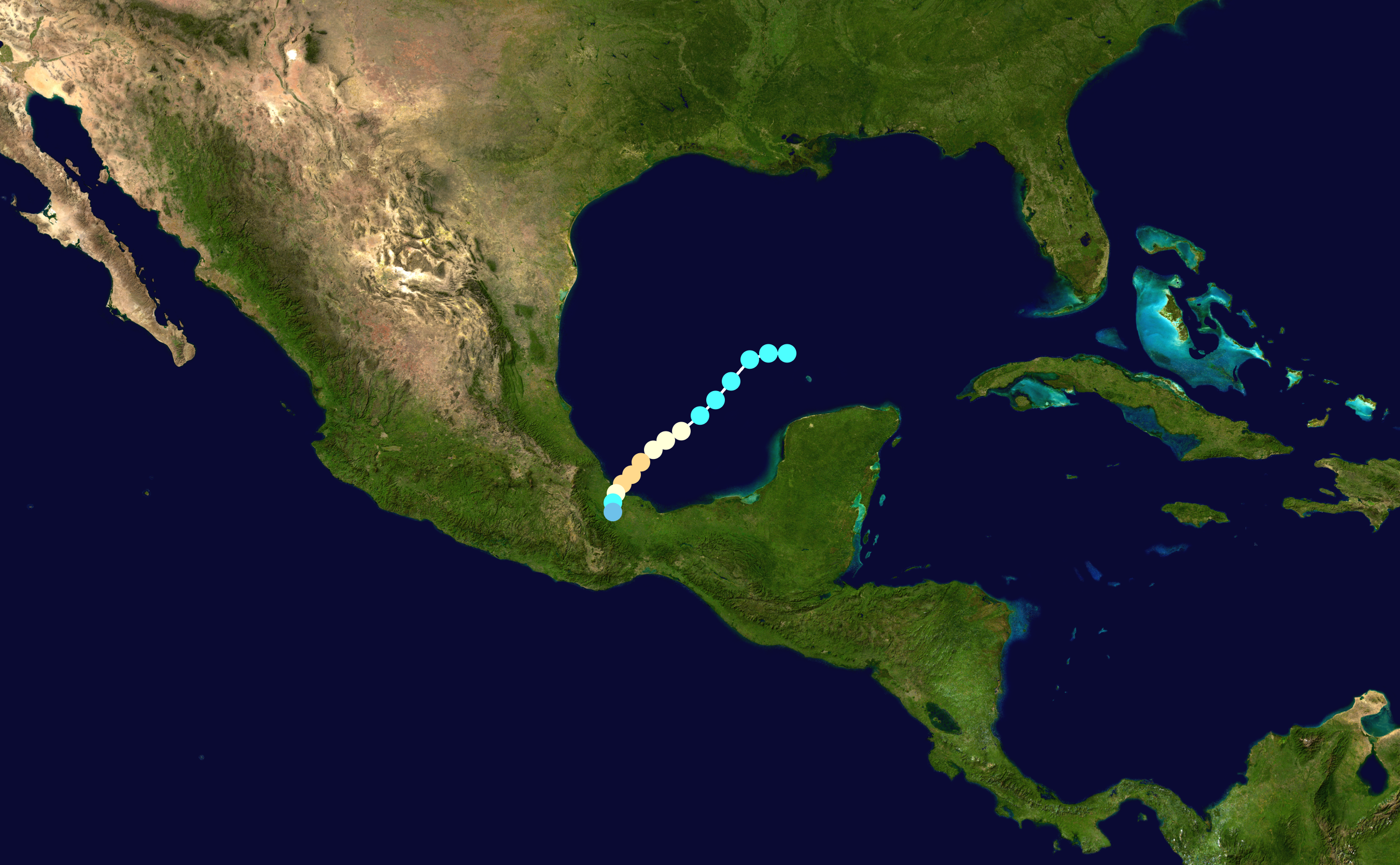
- Duration: October 8 – October 11
- Peak intensity: 105 mph (165 km/h) (1-min); 976 mbar (hPa)

On October 4, a trough was present in the western Caribbean Sea, and was possibly a tropical cyclone. Moving northwest, the system crossed the Yucatán Peninsula and became disrupted, while also associating with a cold front. It emerged into the Gulf of Mexico on October 7 and became more defined. On the next day, the system developed into Tropical Storm Item off the northwest coast of the Yucatán Peninsula. The storm moved to the southwest and intensified into a hurricane on October 9, reaching peak winds of 105 mph (169 km/h) on the next day based on Hurricane Hunters observations. It is possible that Item was stronger, due to the storm's small size but lack of direct observations. On October 11, the hurricane made landfall at 04:00 UTC near Nautla, Veracruz, with peak gusts of 110 mph (180 km/h). The hurricane quickly dissipated over land.

In the sparsely populated area where Item moved ashore, the hurricane dropped heavy rainfall. Newspaper reports considered it the worst storm to hit Mexico in ten years, with damage in Veracruz totaling around $1.5 million (1950 USD, 20.1 million 2026 USD). The strong winds sank 20 ships, and although there were no reports of casualties, Item caused 15 injuries. Communications were disrupted across the region, and downed trees blocked roads. Near Tuxpam, the winds damaged large areas of banana plantations.

=== Hurricane Jig ===
- Category 3 hurricane (SSHWS)
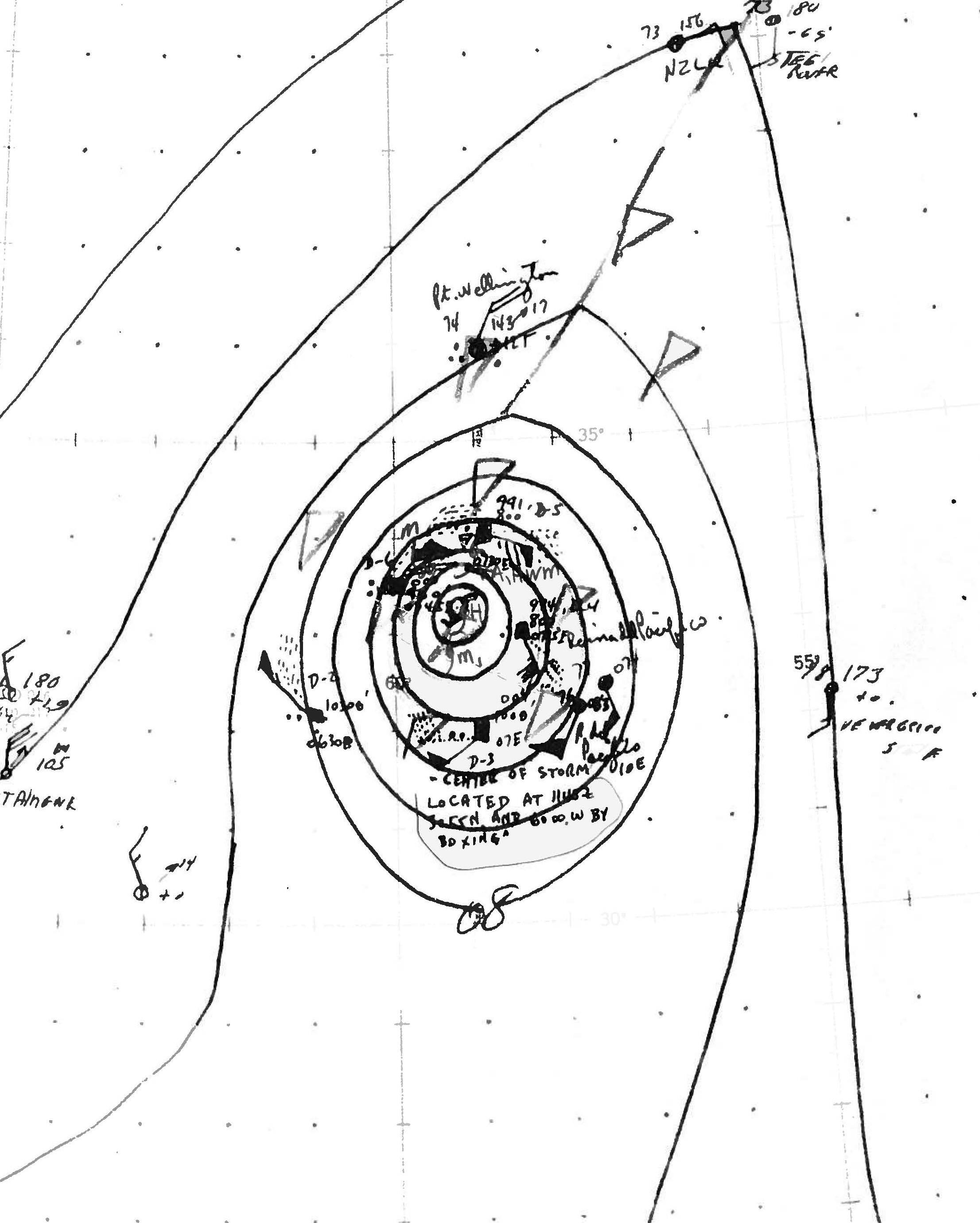
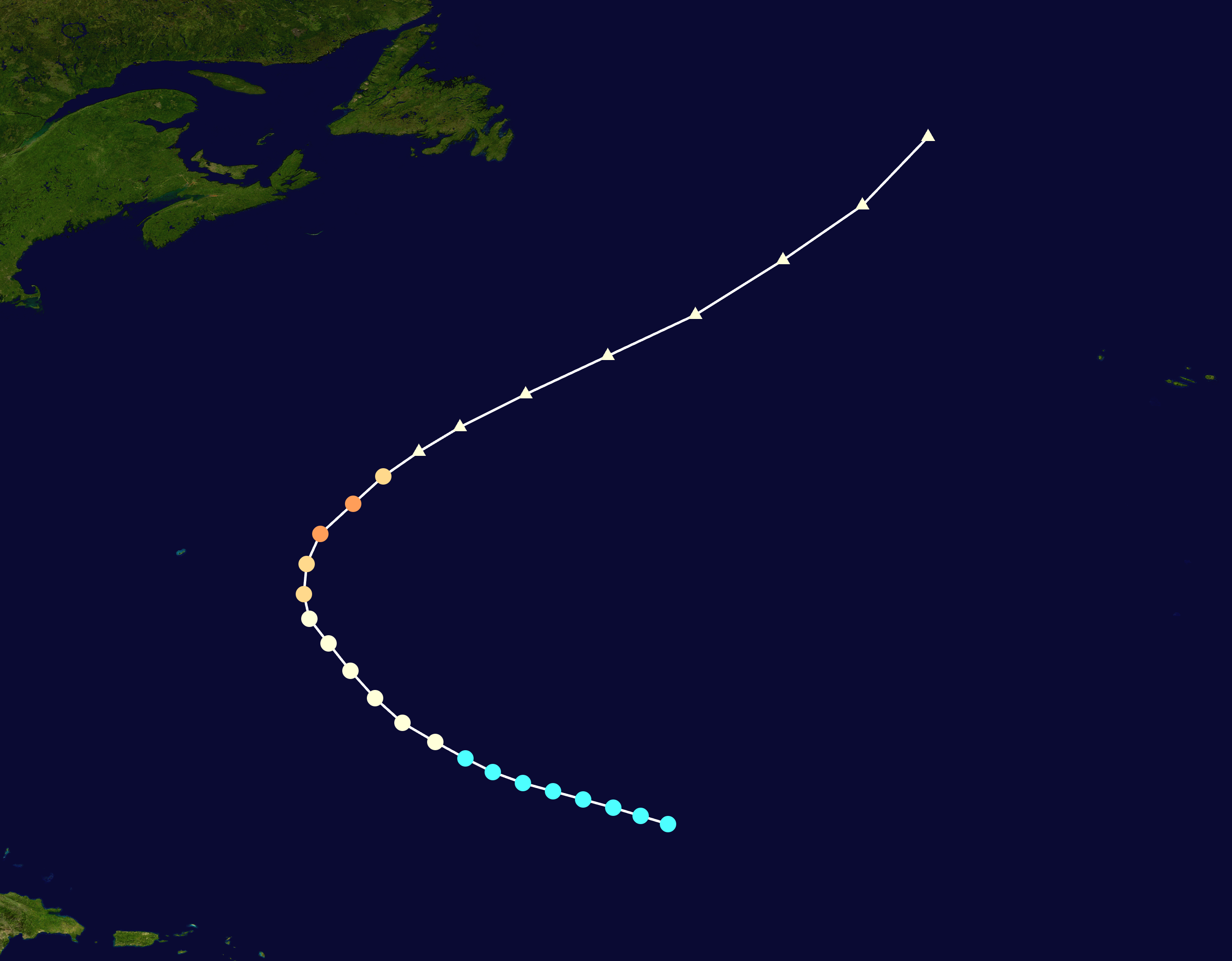
- Duration: October 11 – October 16
- Peak intensity: 115 mph (185 km/h) (1-min); ≤987 mbar (hPa)

A tropical storm was first observed on October 11 in the central Atlantic Ocean, northeast of the Lesser Antilles and southeast of Bermuda. Two days later, a ship reported strong winds and a rapid pressure drop, indicating a hurricane was in the region; the tropical cyclone was given the name Jig. It moved northwestward, steadily intensifying before turning to the north and northeast. On October 15, Hurricane Jig passed about 300 mi (480 km) east of Bermuda, and later that day its sustained winds reach peak winds of 115 mph (185 km/h), although the intensity was uncertain, based on estimates from the Hurricane Hunters. The hurricane began weakening on October 16. Jig became an extratropical cyclone later that day and quickly dissipated, never having affected land due to its small size.

=== Hurricane King ===
- Category 4 hurricane (SSHWS)
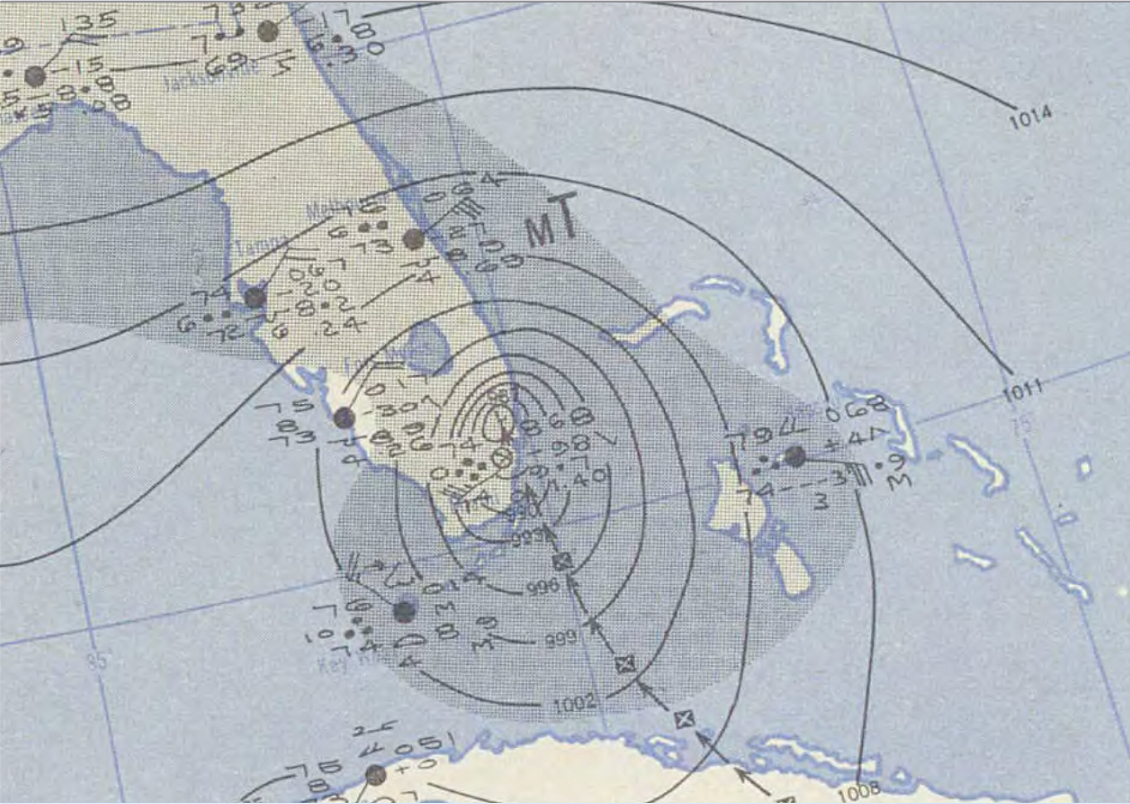
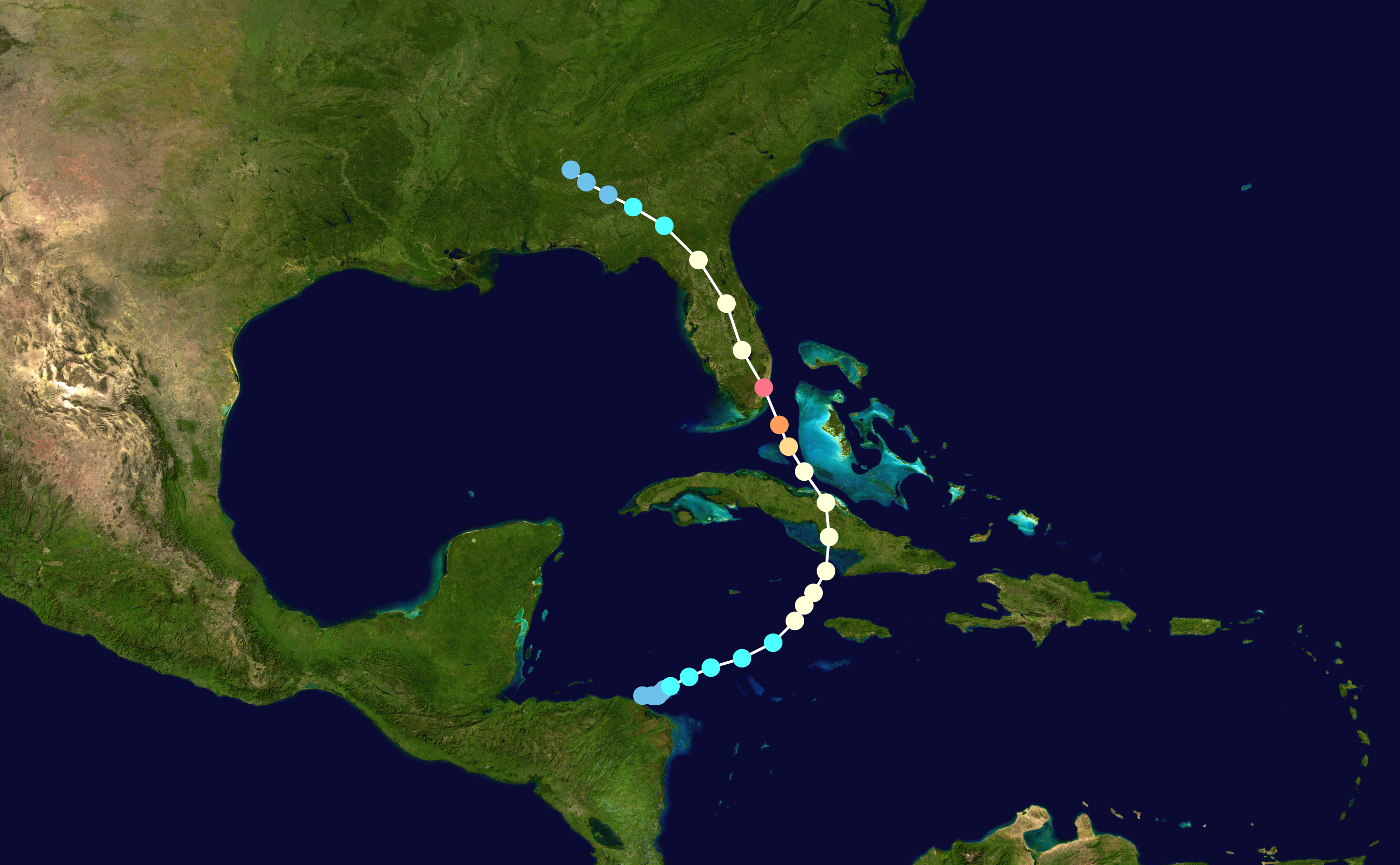
- Duration: October 13 – October 20
- Peak intensity: 130 mph (215 km/h) (1-min); 955 mbar (hPa)

A trough was present in the western Caribbean on October 11. It is estimated that a tropical depression developed just off the north coast of Honduras on October 13, which moved northeastward and intensified into Tropical Storm King the next day. The tropical storm was a small weather system throughout its duration. On October 16, King reached hurricane strength while the passing between Jamaica and the Cayman Islands. The next day, King struck Cuba near Camagüey, Cuba with winds of 90 mph (140 km/h), equivalent to an upper-end Category 1 hurricane. The hurricane killed seven people and caused $2 million (1950 USD, 26.8 million 2026 USD) in damage throughout the country.

After crossing Cuba, King rapidly deepened as it turned toward South Florida, becoming the sixth and final major hurricane of the season on October 18. King made landfall around 04:30 UTC on October 18, with estimated winds of 130 mph (210 km/h), or a Category 4 on the Saffir-Simpson scale; it was the most severe hurricane to impact the city since the 1926 Miami hurricane. As it approached Miami, the hurricane had a radius of maximum winds of 6 mi (9.7 km), and a minimum pressure of 955 mbar (28.2 inHg) was reported as King moved across the city. The swath of destructive winds was only 14 mi (23 km), likened to a small tornado. Early on October 19, King weakened to tropical storm status over north-central Florida, and on the next day it dissipated over western Georgia. There was one additional death in Georgia.

Across Florida, damage totaled $27.75 million (1950 USD, 371 million 2026 USD), of which $15 million (1950 USD, 201 million 2026 USD) was in the Miami metropolitan area. A preliminary survey indicated there were 12,290 houses damaged in the region, with an additional eight destroyed. Along its path through the state, strong winds were observed around Lake Okeechobee, with a 93 mph (150 km/h) gust in Clewiston. Overall, there were three deaths in the state.

=== Tropical Storm Twelve ===
- Tropical storm (SSHWS)
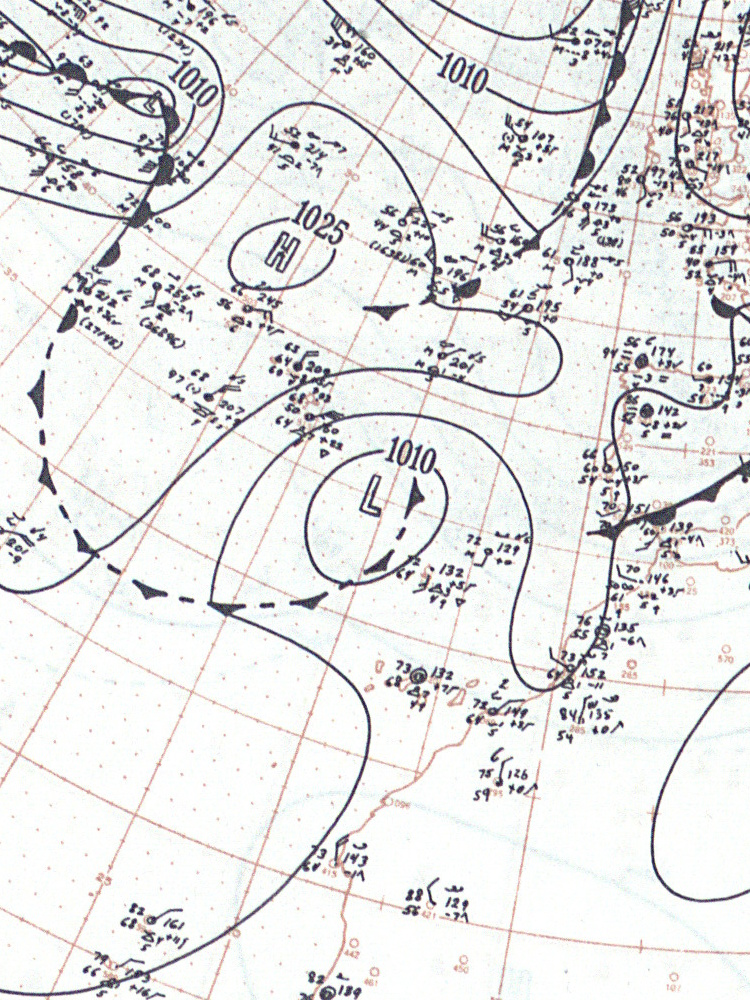
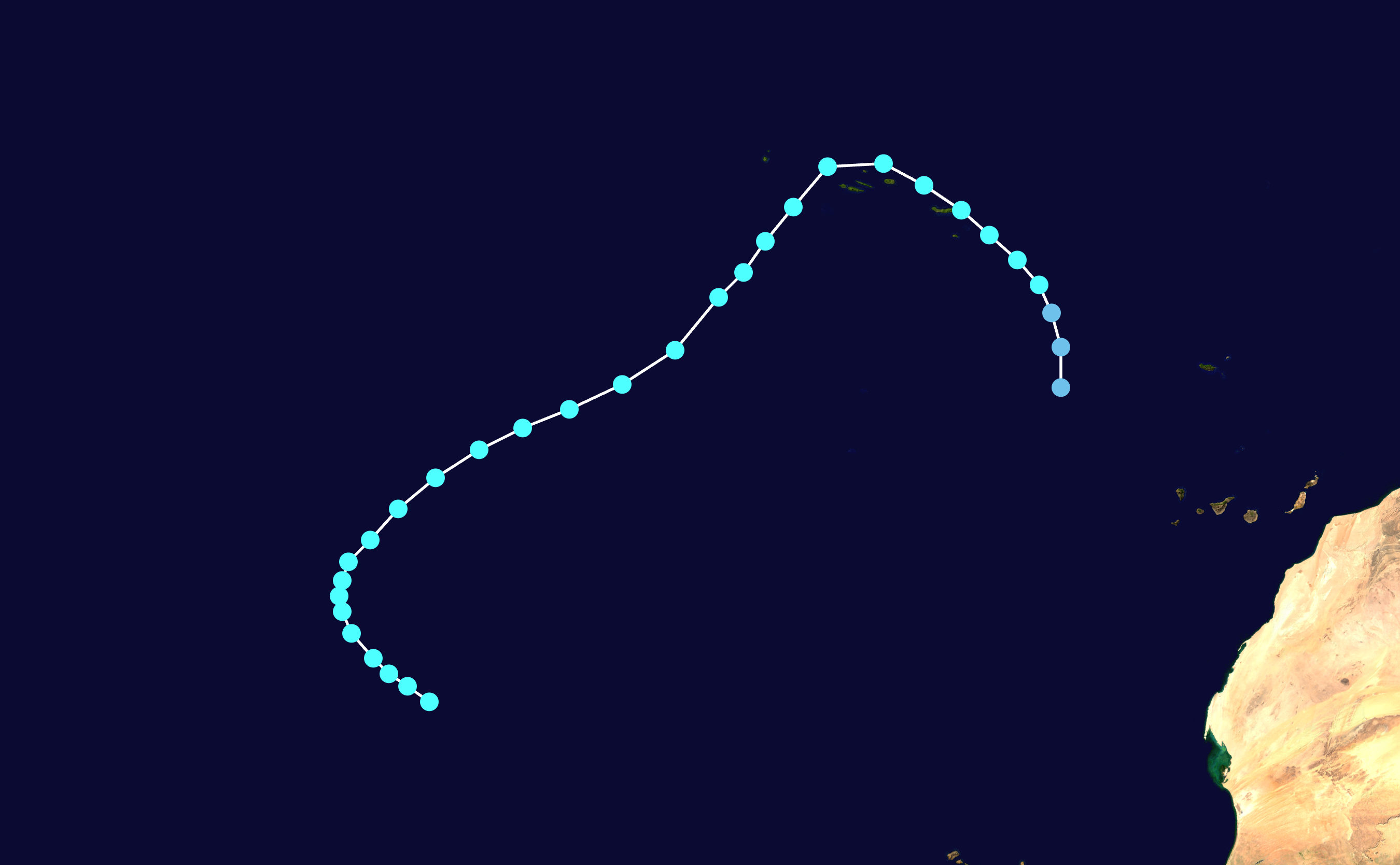
- Duration: October 17 – October 24
- Peak intensity: 70 mph (110 km/h) (1-min); ≤1001 mbar (hPa)

A tropical storm was present in the east-central Atlantic on October 17. It moved northwestward at first before turning to the northeast on October 19, when it was already a small, compact tropical cyclone. The storm steadily intensified as it tracked toward the Azores, and it reached a peak intensity of 70 mph (110 km/h) on October 21. Maintaining its peak strength for 30 hours, the storm began a steady weakening trend before crossing through the southern Azores. It turned to the southeast, weakening to tropical depression status on October 24. Subsequently, the system turned to the south and quickly dissipated. This tropical storm was not included in the Monthly Weather Review's summary of the 1950 hurricane season, but was added to the Atlantic hurricane database in 1959.

=== Hurricane Love ===
- Category 1 hurricane (SSHWS)
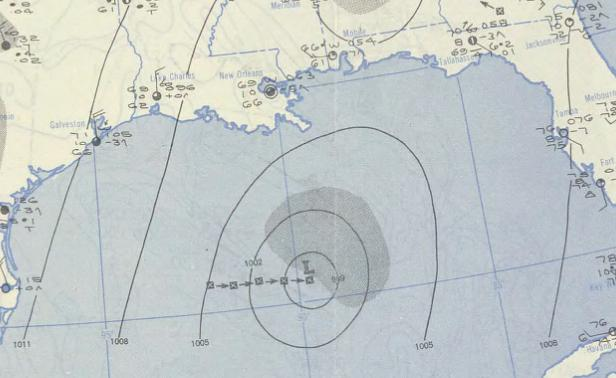
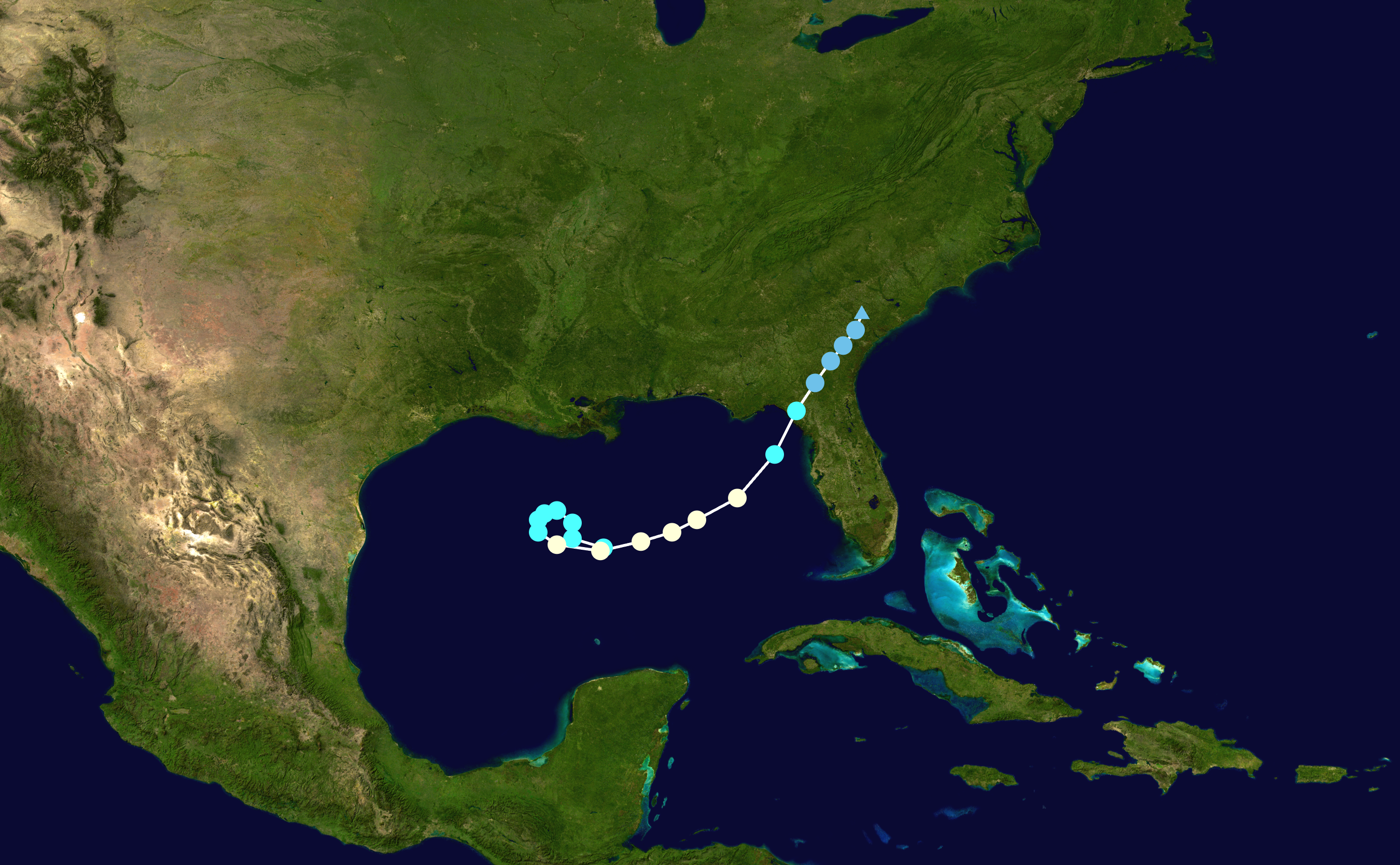
- Duration: October 18 – October 22
- Peak intensity: 80 mph (130 km/h) (1-min); 987 mbar (hPa)

In the wake of Hurricane King moving northward through Florida, an area of low pressure developed into a tropical cyclone on October 18 south of Louisiana. This storm was given the name Love and quickly strengthened, reaching hurricane status shortly thereafter. The storm initially moved westward across the Gulf of Mexico, but soon swung southward into the central portion of the Gulf on October 19. Hurricane Love's maximum sustained winds are believed to have reached their peak intensity early on October 20. Throughout the hurricane's track, dry air infringed on the western side of the tropical cyclone's circulation, which produced unfavorable conditions for additional tropical cyclogenesis. On October 20, the storm began curving northeastward towards the coast of western Florida; however, the dry air completely circled Love's center of circulation, drastically weakening the cyclone in the process. On October 21, Love weakened to a tropical storm, and it struck the Big Bend region of Florida, north of Cedar Key. At the time, its winds were only of moderate gale force, and the storm degenerated into a trough of low pressure shortly thereafter. This combined with an approaching cold front to produce a powerful extratropical storm.

Certain areas began preparing for the storm along Florida's west coast. Hospitals set up emergency facilities in case of power failure, and some coastal residents left their homes. Initially, the storm was forecast to strike the Tampa area, but missed to the north as it weakened. It reportedly left little damage in the sparsely populated land where it made landfall.

=== Tropical Storm Mike ===
- Tropical storm (SSHWS)
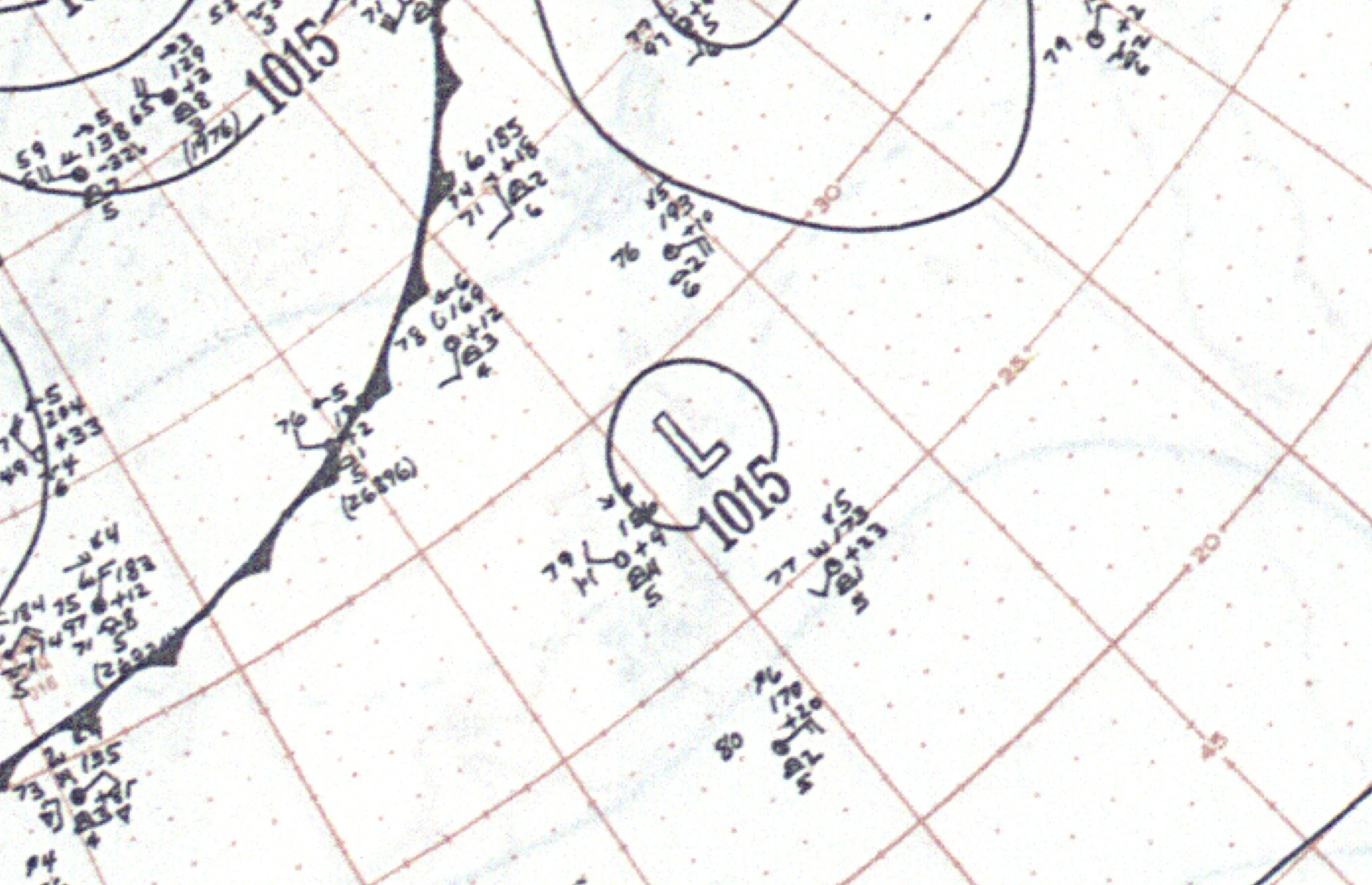
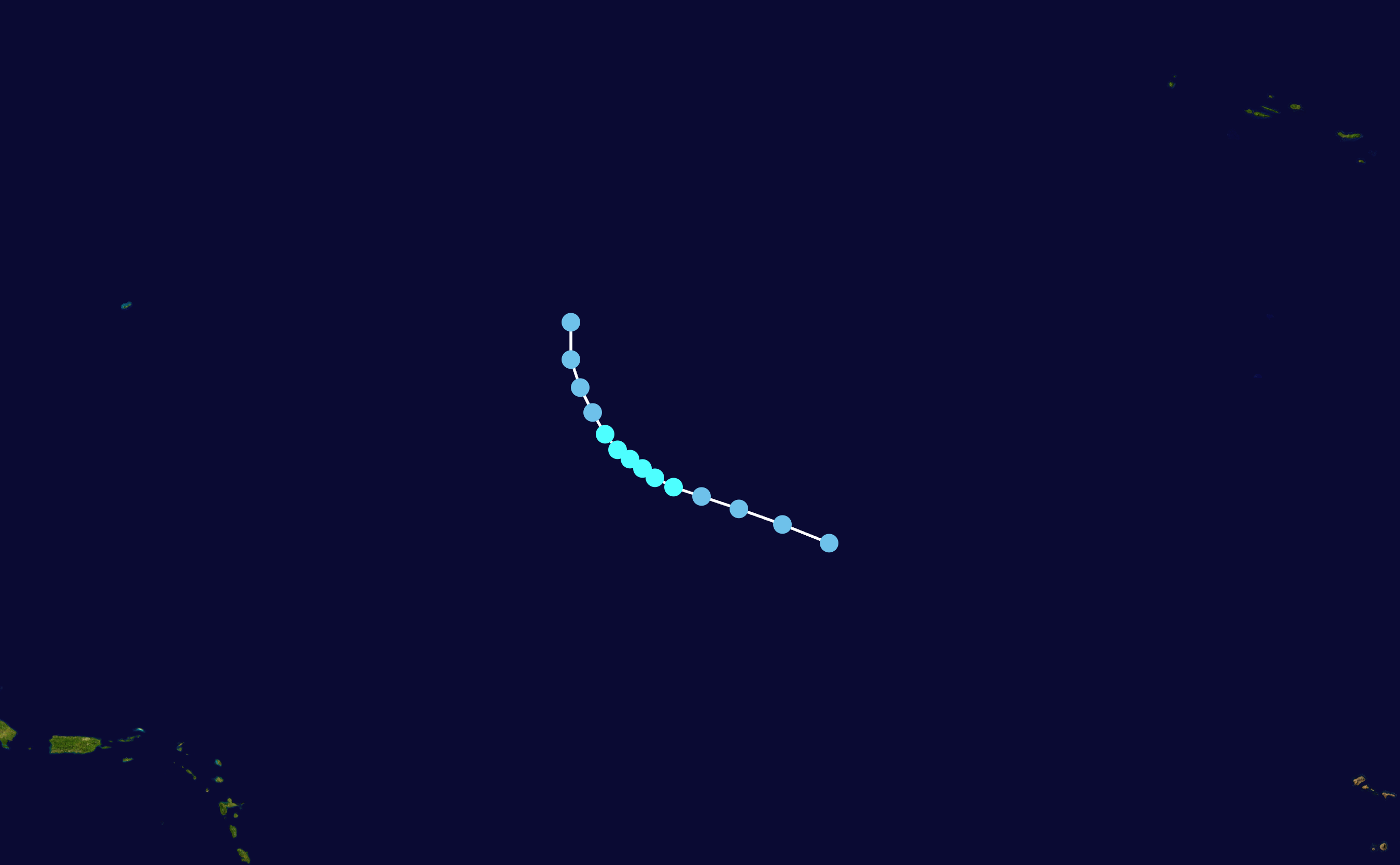
- Duration: October 25 – October 28
- Peak intensity: 45 mph (75 km/h) (1-min); ≤1006 mbar (hPa)

A westerly moving trough was evident in the east-central Atlantic Ocean on October 24, south of a dissipating cold front. Ships in the region reported light winds, and surface observations suggested that a circulation developed by October 25; on that basis, it is estimated that a tropical depression formed. A nearby ship reported gale-force winds on October 27, suggesting that it intensified into a tropical storm with peak winds of 45 mph (72 km/h). An approaching cold front turned the storm northward, which absorbed the storm on October 28. The Air Weather Service (AWS) noted the system as "Storm Mike", but the storm was not included in the annual Monthly Weather Review summary, nor was it included in the database until added by the Atlantic hurricane reanalysis project in 2014.

=== Tropical Storm Fifteen ===
- Tropical storm (SSHWS)
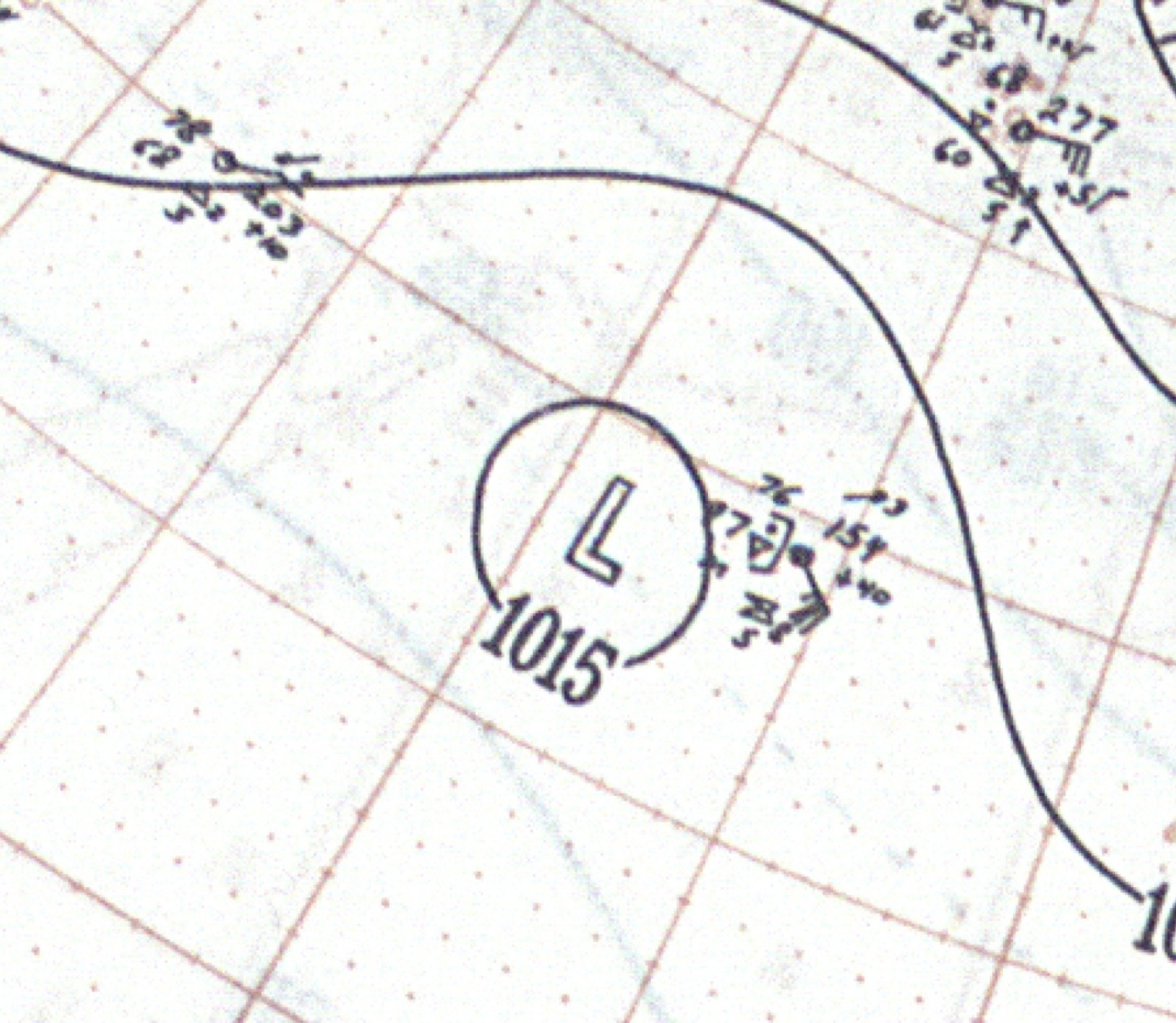
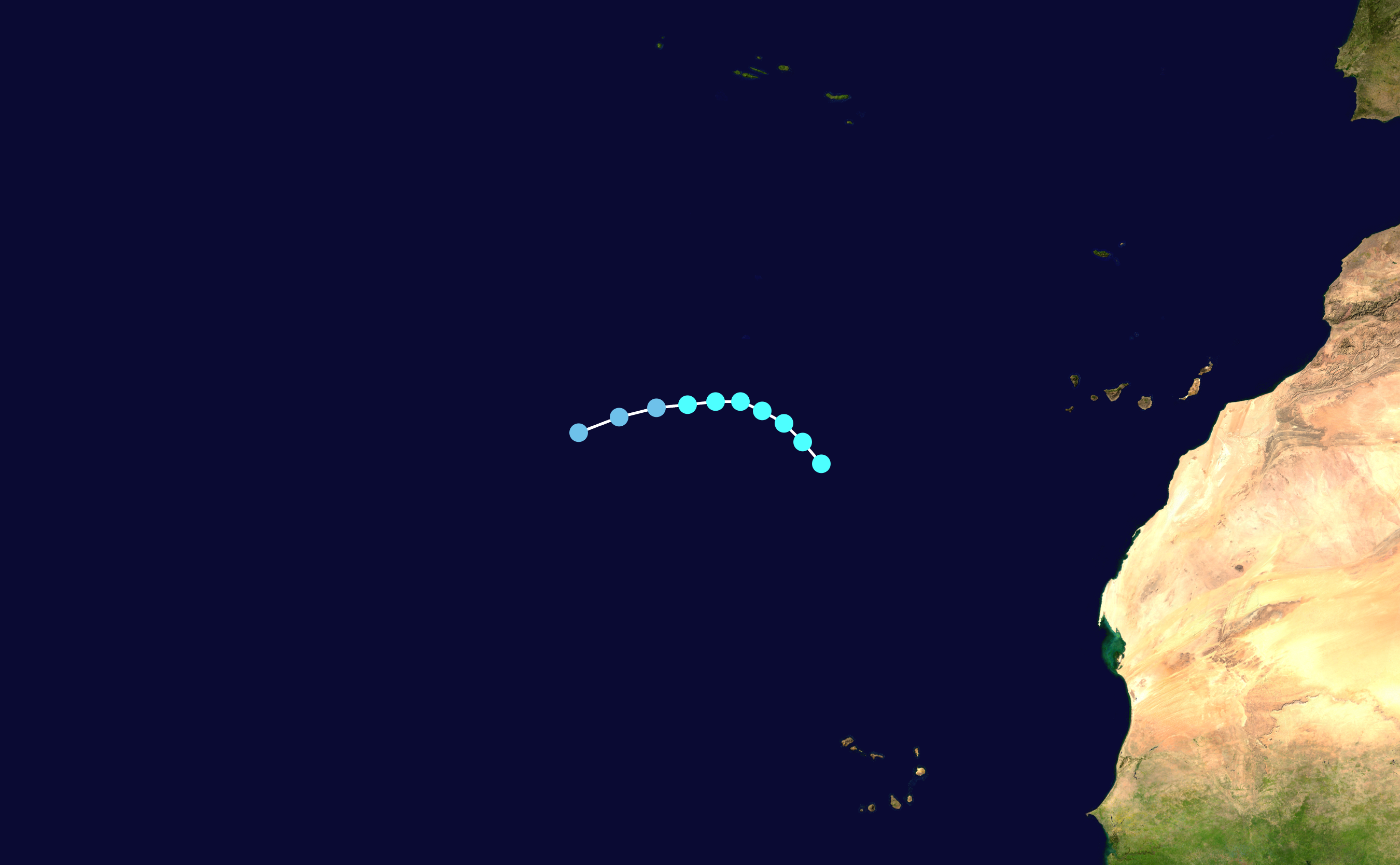
- Duration: October 27 – October 29
- Peak intensity: 50 mph (85 km/h) (1-min); ≤1010 mbar (hPa)

Ships in the eastern Atlantic Ocean suggested that a tropical storm was present on October 28 with peak winds of 50 mph (80 km/h). It was estimated to have originated the previous day. The small storm moved to the northwest and later west into an area of sparse observations, suggesting a weaker system. The system's track ended on October 29 due to uncertainty, but it was estimated to have dissipated soon after.

=== Tropical Storm Sixteen ===
- Tropical storm (SSHWS)
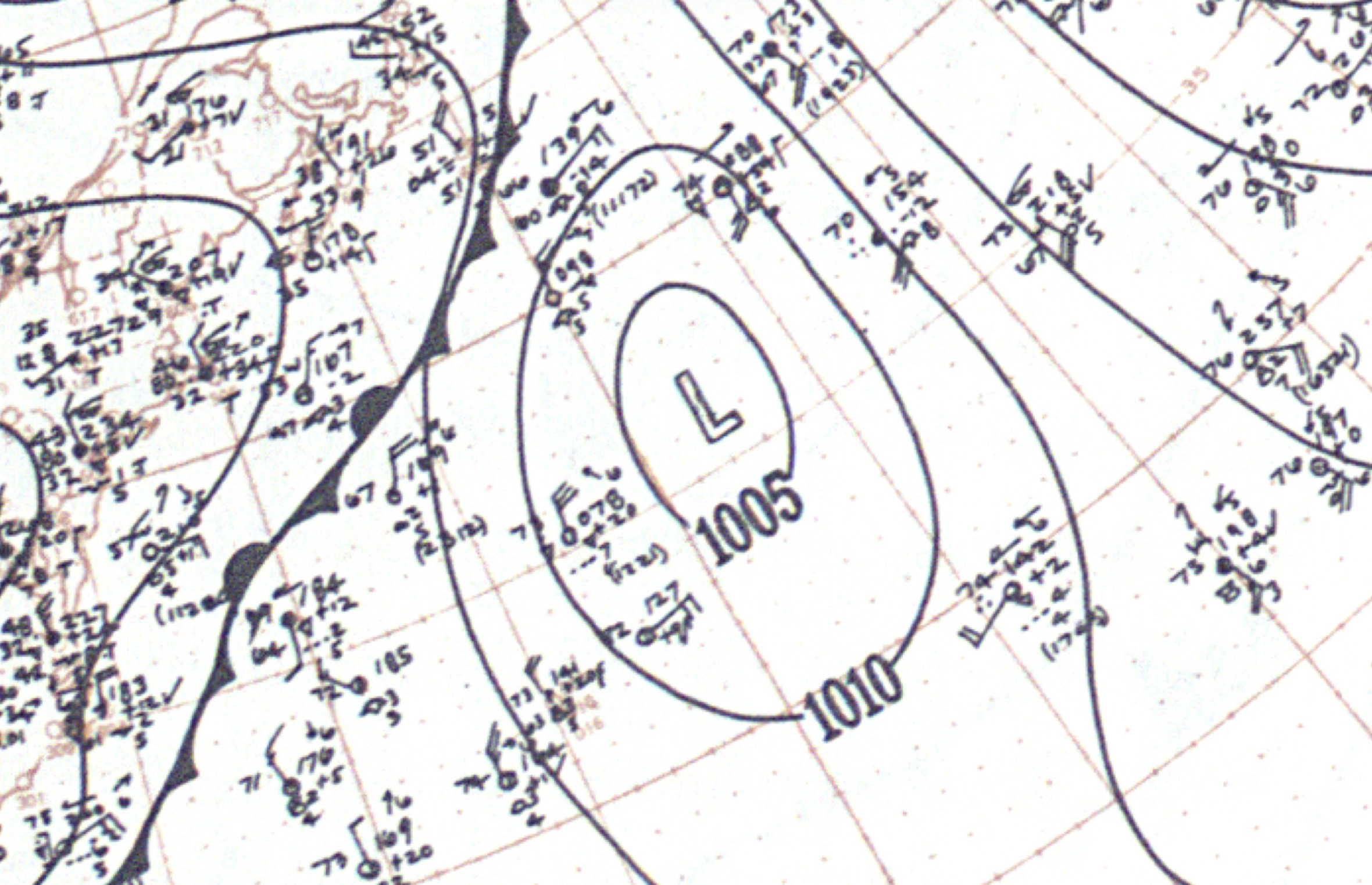
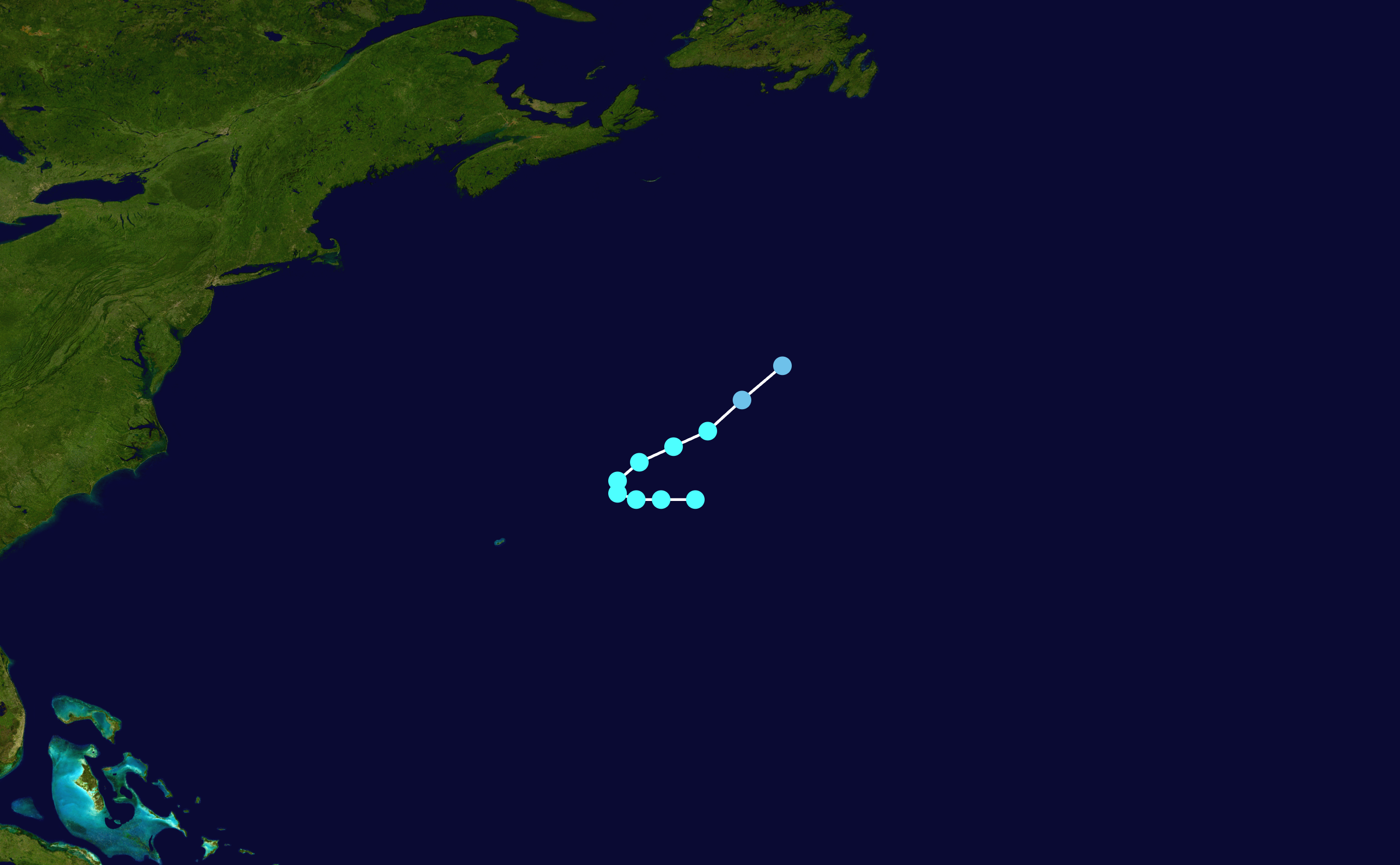
- Duration: November 10 – November 12
- Peak intensity: 70 mph (110 km/h) (1-min); ≤1001 mbar (hPa)

For several days in November, a trough was present across the west-central Atlantic Ocean. On November 10, three ships reported a cyclonic circulation northeast of Bermuda, with peak winds of 70 mph (110 km/h). It was a large system, and would likely have been classified a subtropical cyclone in the satellite era. The storm moved northeastward and weakened, degenerating into a trough on November 12 before being merging with another system.

== Storm names ==
The Joint Army/Navy Phonetic Alphabet was used to name cyclones that attained at least tropical storm status in the North Atlantic in 1950. This was the first season in which tropical storms in the basin were officially given names.

- Able
- Baker
- Charlie
- Dog
- Easy
- Fox
- George
- How
- Item
- Jig
- King
- Love
- Mike
- Nan (unused)
- Oboe (unused)
- Peter (unused)
- Queen (unused)
- Roger (unused)
- Sugar (unused)
- Tare (unused)
- Uncle (unused)
- Victor (unused)
- William (unused)
- Xray (unused)
- Yoke (unused)
- Zebra (unused)

== Season effects ==
This is a table of all of the storms that formed in the 1950 Atlantic hurricane season. It includes their name, duration, peak classification and intensities, areas affected, damage, and death totals. Deaths in parentheses are additional and indirect (an example of an indirect death would be a traffic accident), but were still related to that storm. Damage and deaths include totals while the storm was extratropical, a wave, or a low, and all of the damage figures are in 1950 USD.

Saffir–Simpson scale
TD	TS	C1	C2	C3	C4	C5

1950 North Atlantic tropical cyclone season statistics
Storm name	Dates active	Storm category at peak intensity	Max 1-min wind mph (km/h)	Min. press. (mbar)	Areas affected	Damage (US$)	Deaths	Ref(s).
Able	August 12 – 22	Category 3 hurricane	125 (205)	953	North Carolina, New England, Nova Scotia, Newfoundland	$1.041 million	11	
Baker	August 18 – September 1	Category 2 hurricane	105 (165)	978	Leeward Islands, Puerto Rico, Hispaniola, Cuba, Gulf Coast of the United States	$2.55 million	38	
Charlie	August 21 – September 5	Category 2 hurricane	110 (175)	974	None	None	None	
Dog	August 30 – September 12	Category 4 hurricane	145 (230)	943	Lesser Antilles, Puerto Rico, East Coast of the United States, Bermuda, Atlantic Canada, Northern Ireland, Scotland	$3 million	26 (5)	
Easy	September 1 – 9	Category 3 hurricane	125 (205)	958	Cuba, Florida, Georgia	$3.3 million	0 (2)	
Fox	September 8 – 17	Category 4 hurricane	140 (220)	948	None	None	None	
George	September 27 – October 5	Category 2 hurricane	110 (175)	960	Iceland	None	None	
How	October 1 – 4	Tropical storm	45 (75)	1007	Texas, East Mexico	None	None	
Item	October 8 – 11	Category 2 hurricane	105 (165)	976	Yucatan Peninsula, Western Mexico	$1.5 million	None	
Jig	October 11 – 16	Category 3 hurricane	115 (185)	987	None	None	None	
King	October 13 – 20	Category 4 hurricane	130 (215)	955	Southwestern Florida, Cuba, Bahamas, Georgia	$32 million	11	
Unnamed	October 17 – 24	Tropical storm	70 (110)	1001	None	None	None	
Love	October 18 – 22	Category 1 hurricane	80 (130)	987	Georgia, Louisiana, Southwestern Florida	Minimal	None	
Mike	October 25 – 28	Tropical storm	45 (75)	1008	None	None	None	
Unnamed	October 27 – 29	Tropical storm	50 (85)	1010	None	None	None	
Unnamed	November 10 – 12	Tropical storm	70 (110)	1001	None	None	None	
Season aggregates
16 systems	August 12 – November 12		145 (230)	943		$43.391 million	86 (7)	

== See also ==
- 1950 Pacific hurricane season
- 1950 Pacific typhoon season
- 1950s North Indian Ocean cyclone seasons
- 1900–1950 South-West Indian Ocean cyclone seasons
- 1950s Australian region cyclone seasons
- 1950s South Pacific cyclone seasons
