= Beechwood (Southbridge, Massachusetts) =

Historic house in Massachusetts, United States

- U.S. National Register of Historic Places
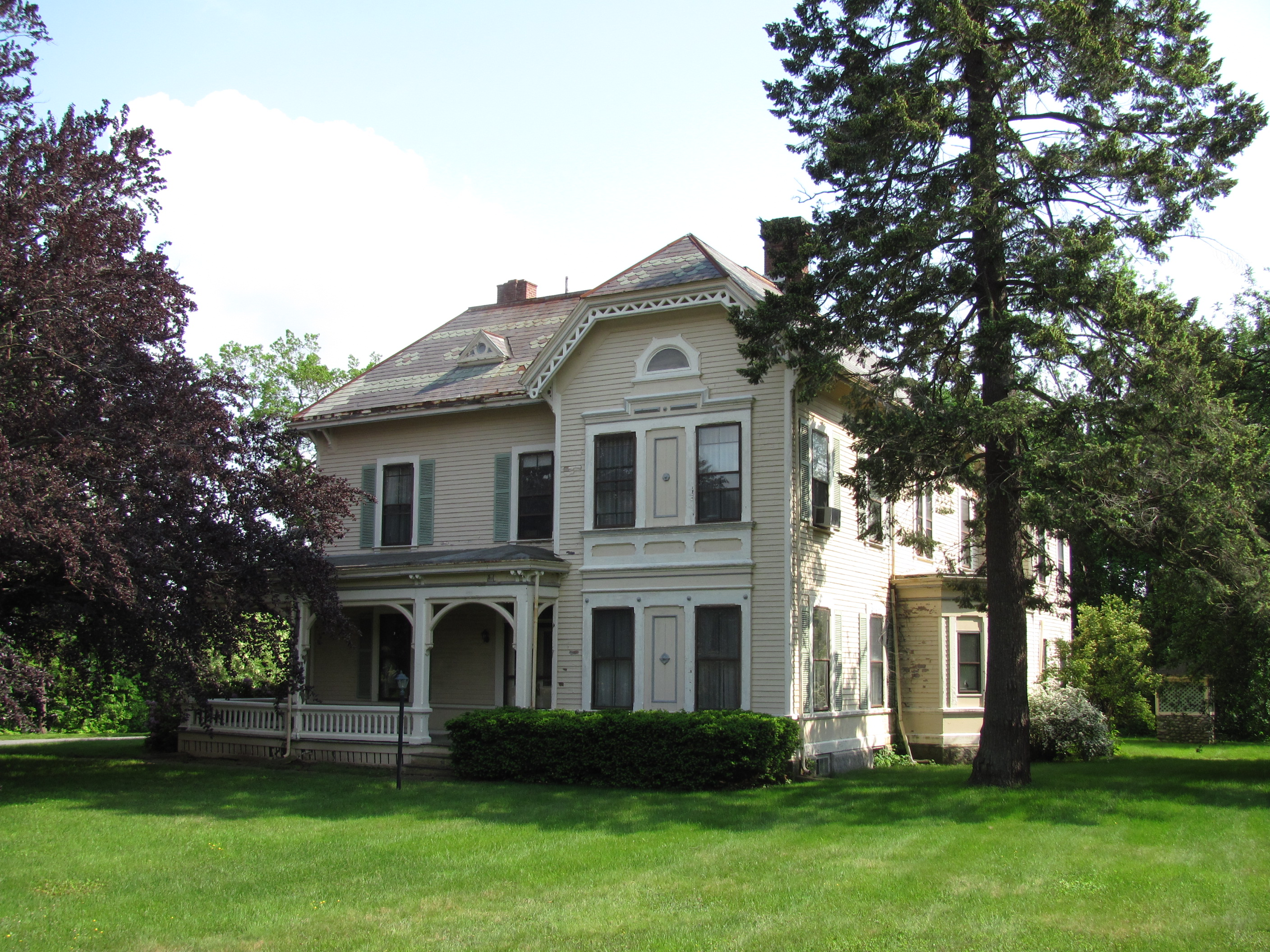
- Beechwood

- Location within Massachusetts Location within the United States
- Location: 495 Main St., Southbridge, Massachusetts
- Coordinates: 42°4′38″N 72°2′18″W
- Area: 1 acre (0.40 ha)
- Built: 1868
- Architectural style: Stick/Eastlake
- MPS: Southbridge MRA
- NRHP reference No.: 89000527
- Added to NRHP: June 22, 1989

Beechwood is a historic house at 495 Main Street in Southbridge, Massachusetts. Built in 1868, it is prominent locally as a fine early example of Stick style architecture, and as one of the first houses to be built that became one of the city's upper-class neighborhoods. It was listed on the National Register of Historic Places in 1989.

== Description and history ==
Beechwood is located near the transition point on the west side of downtown Southbridge between its commercial area and adjacent residential parts of Main Street. It is set on the south side of Main Street, between South and Marcy Streets. It is a 2 1/2-story wood-frame structure, with a complex cross-gabled roof configuration and a mostly clapboarded exterior. The roof is covered in multi-colored slate, and is mainly a side gable, although a clipped gable facing front ends a perpendicular ridge set atop a projecting section. The roof eave is adorned in places with brackets, and in the front-facing gable with bargeboard. A single-story porch shelters the left section of the main facade; it has paneled square posts, a low balustrade, and open-spandrel arches. Windows on the projecting right-side section are separated from each other by decorative wooden paneling.

The house was built in 1868 as a wedding gift from Jedidah Marcy to his granddaughter, and was one of the first houses of the early Victorian style to be built in Southbridge. It was also one of the first built in that section of Southbridge, an area that would not be fully developed until the 1890s. Its porch, while typical of later buildings, shows details that are indicative of the earlier Italianate styling. The Marcys were descendants of one of Southbridge's early settlers, and the house was built nearly across the street from the family homestead (where the Notre Dame Church now stands).

== See also ==
- National Register of Historic Places listings in Southbridge, Massachusetts
- National Register of Historic Places listings in Worcester County, Massachusetts
