= List of North Carolina hurricanes (1950–1979) =

The list of North Carolina hurricanes between 1950 and 1979 encompasses 79 tropical or subtropical cyclones that affected the U.S. state of North Carolina. Collectively, cyclones in North Carolina during that time period resulted in 37 total fatalities during the period, as well as about $3 billion in damage in 2008 USD. A cyclone affected the state in every year during the three decades, and in three seasons a total of five cyclones impacted the state. The strongest hurricane to hit the state during the time period was Hurricane Hazel, which struck the state as a Category 4 hurricane on the Saffir–Simpson hurricane scale. Hazel was both the costliest and deadliest cyclone during the period, causing over $1 billion in damage (2008 USD) and 19 deaths. Most storms affected the state in September, though cyclones impacted the state between May and October.

== 1950s ==
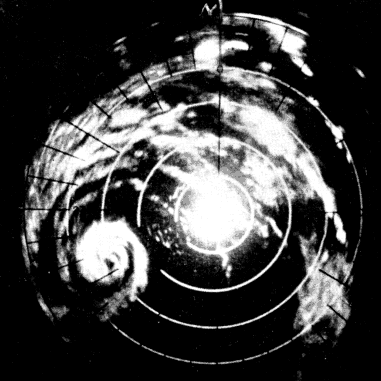
Radar image of Hurricane Connie near North Carolina

- August 20, 1950 – Hurricane Able brushes the Outer Banks with light winds and rough waves.
- September 7, 1950 – Former Hurricane Easy weakens to tropical depression status over Georgia, bringing heavy rainfall to North Carolina which peaks at 9.14 inches (232 mm) in Yancey County.
- September 11, 1950 – Hurricane Dog skirts the coastline as it remains well offshore.
- May 21, 1951 – Hurricane Able produces high surf along the coastline.
- October 4, 1951 – Hurricane How brushes the coastline with heavy surf.
- August 31, 1952 – Tropical Storm Able crosses the center portion of the state, causing moderate precipitation and stream flooding.
- August 14, 1953 – Hurricane Barbara moves ashore near Morehead City with 90 miles per hour (145 km/h) wind gusts and rainfall, which causes about $1.1 million in damage (1953 USD, $8.9 million 2008 USD), mostly from crop damage; one person drowned due to the storm.
- September 28, 1953 – Moisture from former Hurricane Florence brings moderate rainfall to the state.
- August 30, 1954 – Hurricane Carol passes just east of the state, producing 100 miles per hour (161 km/h) wind gusts and rough waves along the Outer Banks; damage is minor, largely limited to crop damage.
- September 10, 1954 – Strong waves from Hurricane Edna cause widespread but minor damage to the Outer Banks.
- October 15, 1954 – Hurricane Hazel moves ashore near the South Carolina/North Carolina border as a Category 4 hurricane, destroying 15,000 buildings and damaging 39,000 more. Damage is greatest in Brunswick County, where great coastal damage occurs due to a powerful storm tide. Considered the most destructive hurricane to affect the state at the time, the hurricane causes an estimated damage total of $136 million (1954 USD, $1.09 billion 2008 USD). Hurricane Hazel injures 200 and kills 19 people in the state.
- August 12, 1955 – Hurricane Connie strikes the Outer Banks and produces severe beach erosion. It drops up to 12 inches (305 mm) of precipitation, which floods large areas of crop lands. No deaths are reported in the state, and damage accrues to $80 million (1955 USD, $640 million 2008 USD).
- August 17, 1955 – Hurricane Diane makes landfall near Wilmington, producing further beach erosion and flooding just five days after the previous hurricane. Wind damage is light, and no fatalities or injuries occur in the state.
- September 19, 1955 – Moving ashore near Morehead City, Hurricane Ione drops heavy rainfall which peaks at 16.6 inches (422 mm) near Maysville. The combination of high tides and rainfall leaves large portions of eastern North Carolina flooded, including large areas of crop lands. The hurricane kills seven, of which two indirectly due to traffic accidents, and damage totals to $88 million (1955 USD, $708 million 2008 USD).
- August 16, 1956 – Hurricane Betsy brushes the coastline with rainfall.
- September 8, 1956 – The interaction between a high-pressure system and Tropical Storm Carla produces moderate winds along the coastline.
- September 26, 1956 – The extratropical remains of Hurricane Flossy produce moderate rainfall across much of the state, which is beneficial after previous dry conditions.
- October, 1956 – A quasi-tropical storm passes over the Outer Banks.
- September 9, 1957 – The remnants of Tropical Storm Debbie brings light rainfall to the state.
- September 18, 1957 – A weak tropical depression crosses the state.
- August 28, 1958 – Hurricane Daisy passes just offshore, producing light winds but little damage.
- September 27, 1958 – Hurricane Helene parallels the coastline just offshore with wind gusts reaching 135 miles per hour (217 km/h). The winds cause moderate structural and crop damage, totaling about $11 million (1958 USD, $82 million 2008 USD).
- July 10, 1959 – Tropical Depression Cindy crosses through the state, producing heavy rainfall and some tornadoes.
- September 30, 1959 – Former Hurricane Gracie passes through the central portion of the state and causes moderate tides near the coastline, as well as heavy rainfall in the inland mountains region.

== 1960s ==
- July 29, 1960 – Crossing the eastern portion of the state, Tropical Storm Brenda produces locally heavy rainfall and gusty winds.
- September 12, 1960 – Hurricane Donna moves across the Outer Banks, causing heavy damage from the combination of high winds and waves. Up to a distance of 50 miles (80 km) inland, strong winds down trees and crops, and damage in the state totals $56.5 million (1960 USD, $422 million 2008 USD). Across the state, over 100 people are injured, and eight people are killed, of which five directly.
- September 14, 1961 – A tropical storm strikes the state, though no serious damage is reported.
- September 20, 1961 – Hurricane Esther passes offshore with slightly above normal tides and light winds.
- September 28, 1962 – Tropical Storm Alma attains hurricane status near the Outer Banks, though winds on land are minor, and little damage is reported.
- October 12, 1962 – The interaction between Hurricane Ella and a high-pressure system produces above normal tides and beach erosion along the coastline.
- October, 1963 – Hurricane Ginny affects the coastline for about a week with rough winds, which cause severe beach erosion; the hurricane destroys one house, though overall damage was limited.
- August 30, 1964 – Former Hurricane Cleo enters the state as a tropical depression, spawning several tornadoes and dropping heavy rainfall.
- September 13, 1964 – Paralleling the coastline just offshore, Tropical Storm Dora causes some beach erosion and precipitation.
- September 21, 1964 – Hurricane Gladys causes high tides along the coastline.
- October 5, 1964 – The remnants of Hurricane Hilda drop moderate to heavy precipitation across the state.
- October 16, 1964 – Hurricane Isbell makes landfall near Morehead City with gusty winds and locally heavy rainfall; damage is minor.
- June 16, 1965 – A former tropical storm crosses through the state.
- September 12, 1965 – After becoming extratropical over the Ohio Valley, the remnants of Hurricane Betsy bring light rainfall to the state.
- June 11, 1966 – Hurricane Alma parallels the coastline offshore, producing above normal tides and moderate precipitation.
- August 29, 1966 – Rough seas from Hurricane Faith cause four drownings along the coastline.
- September 16, 1967 – Tropical Storm Doria enters the state from the northeast with slightly above normal tides; damage is minor.
- June 9, 1968 – Tropical Depression Abby moves across much of the state, dropping moderate precipitation and spawning a tornado near Charlotte.
- October 19, 1968 – Hurricane Gladys passes just offshore, bringing moderate to heavy rainfall across the state; the rainfall is beneficial due to previously dry conditions.
- August 20, 1969 – Tropical Depression Camille drop light rainfall across the western portion of the state.
- September 9, 1969 – Hurricane Gerda brushes the coastline with light winds and rainfall.
- September 24, 1969 – A tropical depression brings light precipitation to much of the state.
- October 15, 1969 – Originally predicted to strike the Outer Banks, Hurricane Kara passes offshore, only affecting small craft.

== 1970s ==
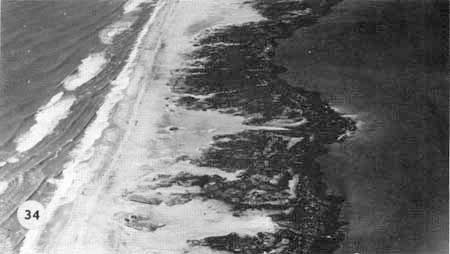
Beach erosion on the Outer Banks from Hurricane Ginger

- May 26, 1970 – The remnants of Hurricane Alma cross the eastern portion of the state.
- August 17, 1970 – An unnamed tropical depression moves across the Outer Banks, bringing locally heavy rainfall and gusty winds.
- August 17, 1971 – A tropical depression moving through the southeastern United States drops up to 12 inches (305 mm) in the state.
- August 27, 1971 – Tropical Storm Doria makes landfall near Morehead City, which causes mudslides from heavy rainfall but overall light damage.
- September 12, 1971 – A tropical depression dissipates in the state after entering through South Carolina.
- September 19, 1971 – The remnants of Hurricane Edith drop moderate precipitation in the western portion of the state.
- September 30, 1971 – Hurricane Ginger makes landfall near Atlantic Beach and slowly moves across the state, dropping heavy rainfall peaking at 15.6 inches (396 mm) at Bodie Island. The precipitation causes severe crop damage totalling $10 million (1971 USD, $53 million 2008 USD).
- May 26, 1972 – Subtropical Storm Alpha attains gale-force winds to the southeast of the Outer Banks after dropping 6.97 inches (177 mm) of rainfall at Ocracoke.
- June 21, 1972 – The remnants of Hurricane Agnes re-attain tropical storm status over the northeastern portion of the state. The interaction with a low to its west results in heavy rainfall of up to 10.6 inches (269 mm) on Mount Mitchell, which causes record river flooding and severe crop damage. Throughout the state, Agnes causes two deaths and $6.56 million in damage (1972 USD, $33.8 million 2008 USD).
- July 12, 1972 – A tropical depression moves ashore near the South Carolina/North Carolina border.
- August 31, 1972 – Attaining tropical storm status to the southeast of the state, Tropical Storm Carrie drops light precipitation along the coastline.
- September 15, 1972 – The remnants of Hurricane Dawn dissipate offshore of South Carolina, dropping very light rainfall in North Carolina.
- October 24, 1973 – The remnants of Tropical Depression Gilda reform into a large subtropical cyclone, which produces gale-force winds and beach erosion along the Outer Banks.
- June 26, 1974 – The first subtropical storm of the season brushes the coastline with light rainfall.
- June 26, 1974 – A tropical depression transitions into an extratropical cyclone, with its remnants dropping moderate precipitation near the coastline.
- October 8, 1974 – The fourth subtropical storm of the season produces rainfall in the eastern portion of the state as it parallels offshore.

Hurricane Belle to the southeast of the state

- June 29, 1975 – A tropical depression intensifies into Tropical Storm Amy, after brushing the Outer Banks with light rainfall.
- September 24, 1975 – The remnants of Hurricane Eloise become extratropical over eastern Tennessee, spawning a few tornadoes and dropping moderate precipitation across western North Carolina.
- October 2, 1975 – Hurricane Gladys threatens the Outer Banks with rough waves, but remains well offshore.
- October 27, 1975– Tropical Storm Hallie brushes the coastline with light precipitation.
- May 24, 1976– Subtropical Storm One drops light rainfall near the coastline as parallels the coastline.
- August 9, 1976– Hurricane Belle passes just offshore, producing strong wind gusts and a moderate storm tide that left areas flooded.
- August 20, 1976 – Tropical Storm Dottie moves ashore along South Carolina, causing beach erosion and locally heavy rainfall in southern North Carolina.
- September 15, 1976 – A subtropical depression brings moderate rainfall as it crosses the state.
- September 6, 1977 – The tropical depression that later becomes Hurricane Clara brushes the coastline with light precipitation.
- September 9, 1977 – The remnants of Hurricane Babe near the South Carolina/North Carolina border, producing rainfall across the entire state that peaks at 8.99 inches (228 mm) in Transylvania County.
- August 29, 1978 – Tropical Storm Debra strikes Louisiana, with its remnants producing rainfall in the northern North Carolina.
- September 2, 1978 – Hurricane Ella turns northeastward well offshore after threatening the Outer Banks; it causes some beach erosion and loss of tourism during the traditionally busy Labor Day Weekend.
- July 15, 1979 – The remnants of Hurricane Bob cross the eastern portion of the state from north to south, exiting into the Atlantic Ocean near Morehead City after dropping light rainfall.
- July 31, 1979 – The remnants of Tropical Storm Claudette dissipate after producing light rainfall in the northeastern portion of the state.
- September 5, 1979 – Former Hurricane David crosses the central portion of the state, dropping heavy rainfall peaking at 15.4 inches (391 mm) in New Holland. The storm causes flooding and beach erosion, though no significant damage is reported.
- September 14, 1979 – Former Hurricane Frederic passes through eastern Tennessee, and drops locally moderate precipitation in western North Carolina.

== Monthly statistics ==
Number of recorded storms affecting North Carolina
Month	Number of storms
May	4
June	7
July	5
August	18
September	32
October	13

== Deadly storms ==
The table lists hurricanes by death tolls. Direct deaths are those that are directly caused by the storm passage, such as drownings or deaths from being struck by windblown objects. Indirect deaths are those that are related to the storm, but not directly from its storm effects.

Name	Year	Number of deaths
Hazel	1954	19 direct
Donna	1960	5 direct (3 indirect)
Ione	1955	5 direct (2 indirect)
Faith	1966	4 direct
Agnes	1972	2 direct
Barbara	1953	1 direct

== See also ==
- Geography of North Carolina
- List of North Carolina hurricanes
