= List of storms named Abby =

The name Abby has been used for six tropical cyclones worldwide, three in the Atlantic Ocean and three in the Western Pacific Ocean.

In the Atlantic:

- Hurricane Abby (1960) – a Category 2 hurricane that made landfall in British Honduras (now Belize)
- Tropical Storm Abby (1964) – made landfall in Texas
- Hurricane Abby (1968) – a Category 1 hurricane that made landfall in Cuba and then in Florida

In the Western Pacific:

- Typhoon Abby (1979) (T7923, 27W, Barang) – a Category 3 typhoon that did not approach land
- Typhoon Abby (1983) (T8305, 05W, Diding) – a Category 5 super typhoon that impacted Japan as a weakening system
- Typhoon Abby (1986) (T8616, 13W, Norming) – a Category 2 typhoon that hit Taiwan
