= Hurricane Abby (1968) =

Category 1 Atlantic hurricane in 1968

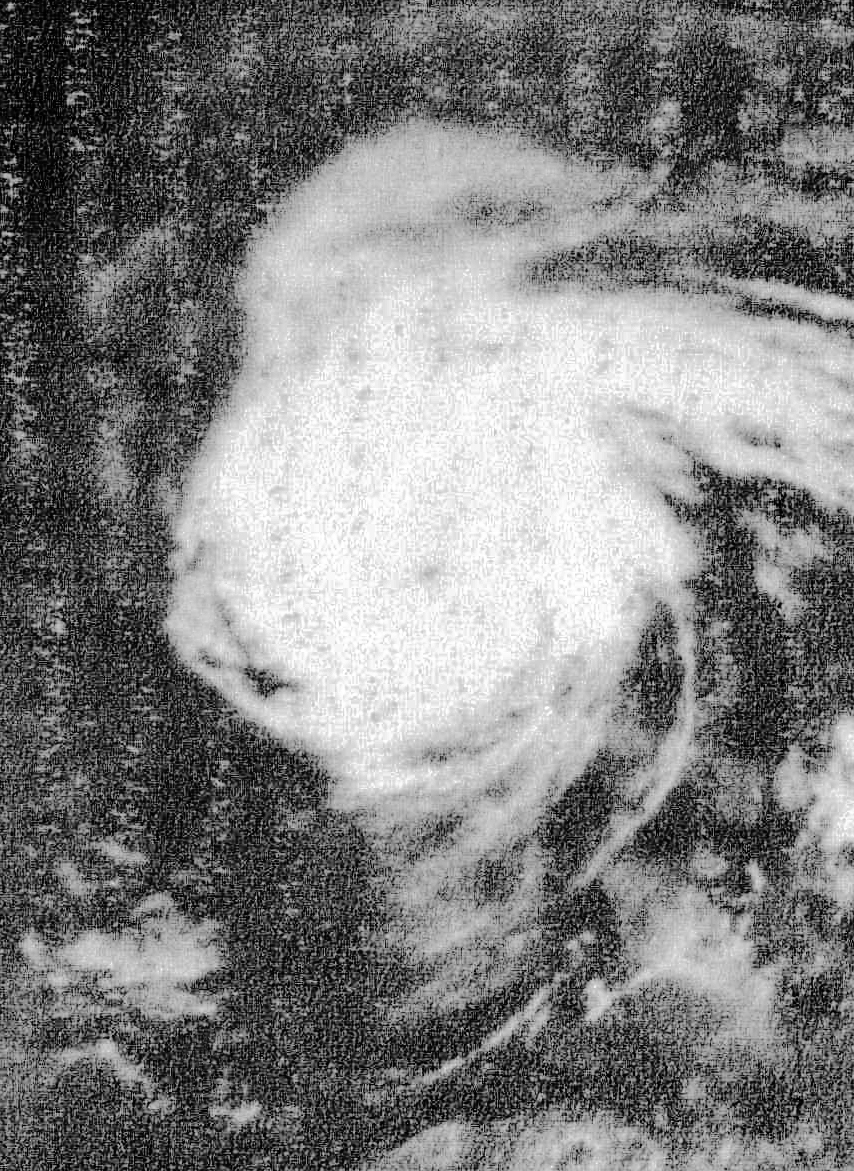
- Abby as a hurricane on June 6, 1968.

Meteorological history
- Formed: June 1, 1968
- Dissipated: June 13, 1968

Category 1 hurricane
- 1-minute sustained (SSHWS/NWS)
- Highest winds: 75 mph (120 km/h)
- Lowest pressure: 992 mbar (hPa); 29.29 inHg

Overall effects
- Fatalities: 6 indirect
- Damage: $450,000 (1968 USD)
- Areas affected: Cuba, Florida, Georgia, Carolinas
- IBTrACS
- Part of the 1968 Atlantic hurricane season

Hurricane Abby made landfall in Cuba, Florida, and North Carolina in June 1968. The first tropical cyclone, first named storm, and first hurricane on the season, Abby developed over the northwestern Caribbean Sea on June 1, as a result of the interaction between a mid-tropospheric trough and a cold front. Moving generally north-northeastward, the depression slowly strengthened while approaching the western tip of Cuba, becoming Tropical Storm Abby late on June 2. Shortly thereafter, Abby made landfall in Pinar del Río Province. The storm dropped heavy rainfall in western Cuba, with up to 12 inches (300 mm) on Isla de la Juventud. However, no flooding was reported. After reaching the southeastern Gulf of Mexico on June 3, Abby strengthened further and became a Category 1 hurricane on the modern-day Saffir–Simpson hurricane wind scale. However, early on June 4, Abby weakened to a tropical storm. Around midday on June 4, the system made landfall near Punta Gorda, Florida as a strong tropical storm.

Initially, Abby weakened slightly after moving inland, but then maintained intensity while tracking slowly eastward across Florida. By midday on June 5, the system emerged into the Atlantic Ocean, but made another landfall near Atlantic Beach late on June 6. The storm weakened slowly weakened and fell to tropical depression intensity over eastern Georgia about 24 hours later. Abby then moved in a parabolic path across the Carolinas, eventually re-emerging into the Atlantic from South Carolina early on June 11. By late on the following day, Abby made another landfall near Swansboro, North Carolina. The storm moved offshore again on June 13, before finally dissipating near the Delmarva Peninsula.

Abby's slow movement produced heavy rains across Florida and the Southeastern United States which caused 6 indirect fatalities and $450,000 (1968 USD, $3 million 2013 USD) in damage.

== Meteorological history ==
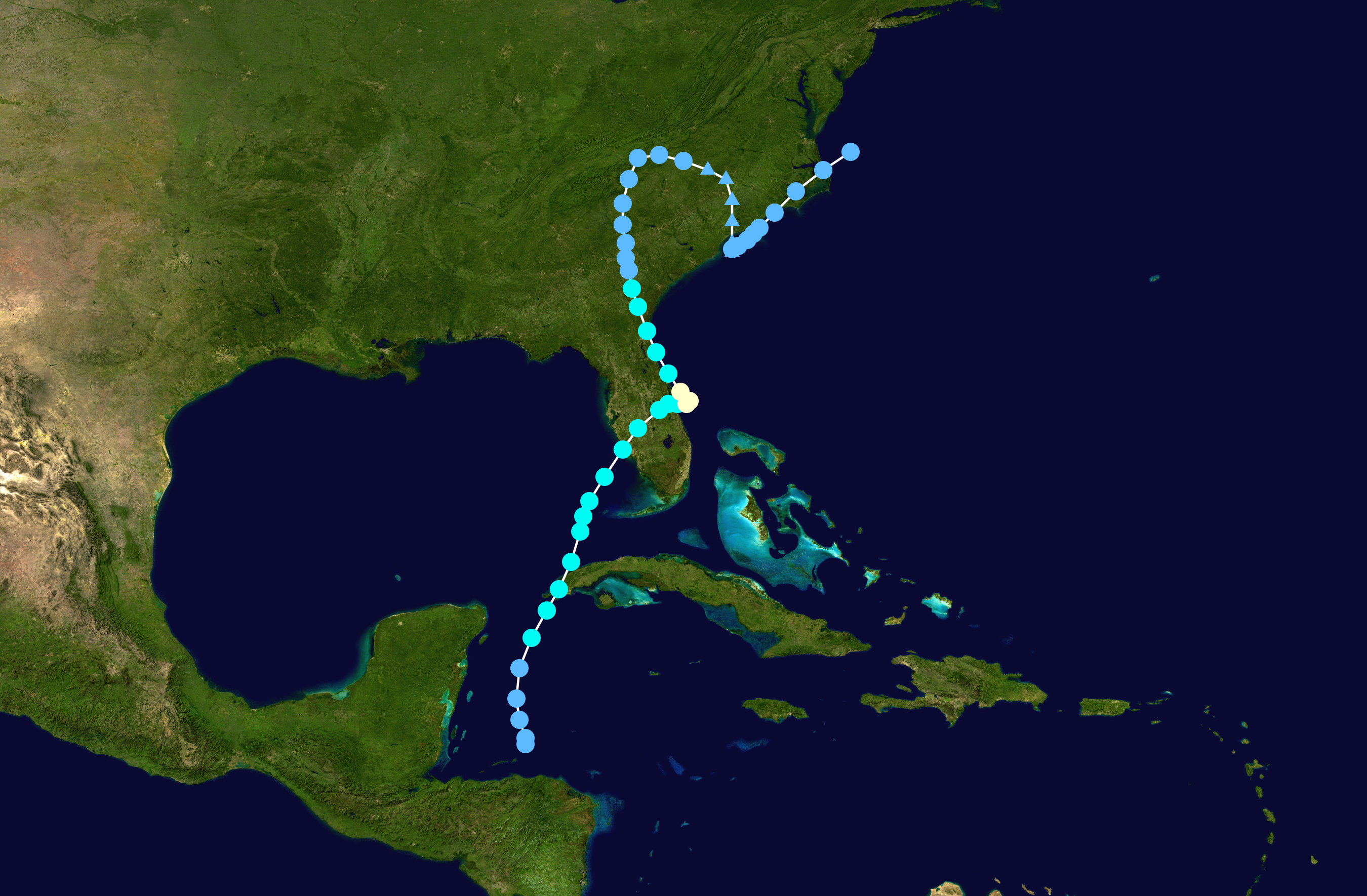
Map plotting the storm's track and intensity, according to the Saffir–Simpson scale Map key Saffir–Simpson scale Tropical depression (≤38 mph, ≤62 km/h) Tropical storm (39–73 mph, 63–118 km/h) Category 1 (74–95 mph, 119–153 km/h) Category 2 (96–110 mph, 154–177 km/h) Category 3 (111–129 mph, 178–208 km/h) Category 4 (130–156 mph, 209–251 km/h) Category 5 (≥157 mph, ≥252 km/h) Unknown Storm type Tropical cyclone Subtropical cyclone Extratropical cyclone, remnant low, tropical disturbance, or monsoon depression

A mid-tropospheric trough persisted over the western Caribbean Sea in late May. Around that time, a short-wave trough moving eastward through the Caribbean Sea forced a cold front to move southward into the Straits of Florida. Satellite imagery indicated that the cold front and mid-tropospheric trough began merging as the low-level convergence field increased. Thereafter, barometric pressures in the western Caribbean were decreasing as deep southwesterly flow caused very warm and moist air to enter the area. At 0600 UTC on June 1, the system developed into Tropical Depression One, while situated about 55 miles (89 km) northeast of Guanaja, Honduras.

When a weak cold front moved into the area, it generated convection, gaining enough organization to be called a tropical depression on June 1. The initial circulation was not embedded within the convection, but as it moved slowly north-northeastward, it was able to strengthen and become better organized, reaching tropical storm strength on the 2nd. It crossed the western tip of Cuba, and upon reaching the southeast Gulf of Mexico Abby achieved hurricane strength. Abby then reached a peak intensity 75 mph (121 km/h) and before weakening back to tropical storm strength.

Abby soon made landfall as a tropical storm near Punta Gorda, Florida on the 4th, and moved across the state. Once it reached the western Atlantic, building high pressure to its east forced Abby northwestward. On the 6th, it again reached the Florida coast, this time near Jacksonville. Abby weakened to a tropical depression as it moved over Georgia, and over the next 6 days, it wandered around the Carolinas, finally dissipating on the 13th east of Virginia. The remnants of Abby were absorbed by a cold front the same day.

== Preparations ==
At 2200 UTC on June 2, the Weather Bureau posted a gale warning from south of Tampa Bay to Melbourne on the east coast, including the Florida Keys and Lake Okeechobee. Around 1600 UTC on June 3, the National Hurricane Center began issuing tropical storm warnings from Marco Island to Tarpon Springs, Florida, while gale warnings were extended northward to Cedar Key. After about 24 hours, the hurricane warning was discontinued. Simultaneously, the gale warning area was revised to include from Venice to Tarpon Springs on the west coast and from Palm Beach to Jacksonville on the east coast. Late on June 4, gale warnings on the west coast of Florida were discontinued. The gale warning was changed to a storm warning from Melbourne to Jacksonville late on June 5. Simultaneously, a hurricane watch was posted for the same areas. The remaining portion of the gale warning, south of Melbourne, was discontinued at 1000 UTC on June 6. Around that time, the storm warning and hurricane watch were extended further north to Charleston, South Carolina. Six hours later, the hurricane watch was discontinued for areas south of Daytona Beach, Florida. At 1900 UTC on June 6, the storm warning was discontinued at and south of St. Augustine, Florida, while the entire hurricane watch was canceled. Three hours later, the storm warning was condensed to include only Fernandina Beach, Florida to Charleston. The storm warning was canceled south of Savannah, Georgia at 1000 UTC on June 7. Four hours later, the remaining storm warning, from Savannah to Charleston, was discontinued.

In May, the United States Army Corps of Engineers (USACE) scheduled a mock preparation session for the 1968 Atlantic hurricane season. However, as Abby approached, the USACE was faced with a real threat. About 100 men from the Clewiston area filled and placed sand bags around Lake Okeechobee and secure equipment. Additionally, other residents were warned of potential evacuation procedures. In Hillsborough County, about 30 schools were listed as available for shelters.

On June 4, military personnel from McCoy Air Force Base were evacuated to Wright Patterson Air Force Base in Ohio. Tanker planes of the 306th and 909th squadrons were diverted to Loring Air Force Base in Maine while other air squadrons were placed on alert.

== Impact ==
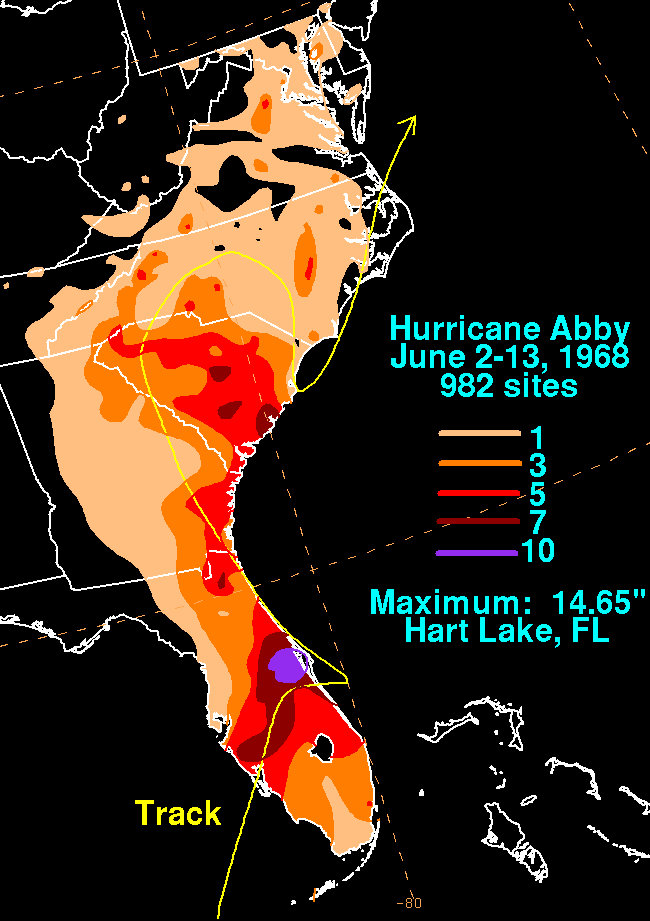
Rainfall totals from Hurricane Abby.

In Cuba, Abby dropped 12 inches (305 mm) of rain in Isle of Pines and wind gusts up to 50 mph were reported. There were no reports of damage or fatalities from Abby's impact on Cuba.

Abby dropped 4–8 inches (102–203 mm) of rain across southern and western Florida. The highest rainfall total was 14.65 inches (372 mm) in Hart Lake. On the Florida Panhandle, rainfall up to 2 inches (50.8 mm) was reported. Gusts went as high as 87 knots at the 60-ft Tower. Four tornadoes were reported during Abby's landfall. Two of which caused $8,000 (1968 USD) in damage in Florida. Six fatalities resulted from drowning, electrocutions and traffic accidents were reported during the storms landfall. In all, damage in Florida by Abby amounted to $250,000 (1968 USD). The rainfall was beneficial in Florida, as it aided in ending a drought in the state. Two tornadoes in Florida were spawned in association with Abby, both on June 4. One was near the Indian River in Brevard County at 6:30 pm EDT. No injuries were reported and damage was estimated at less than $5,000 worth of damage. The second tornado touched down in Polk County at around 9:30 pm EDT. It resulted in no injuries and caused less than $500 in damage. A funnel cloud was observed at Cape Kennedy around 8:10 am, but it never touched the ground.

The state of Georgia received rainfall up to 7 inches (180 mm) and winds gusting to 41 mph (66 km/h). Also, heavy rains caused minor flood damage but no fatalities or injuries were reported. In North Carolina, two tornadoes were reported in Charlotte and Monroe. The tornadoes caused US$30,000 in damage. Elsewhere in North Carolina, rainfall was moderate as the storm dropped 2-11 inches (50.8–279 mm) of rain across North Carolina. However, no fatalities were reported in North Carolina.

Overall, Abby left six fatalities and caused US$450,000 (US$4.2 million, July 2025) in damage.

== See also ==
- Other storms of the same name
- List of Florida hurricanes (1950–1974)
- List of Georgia hurricanes
- List of North Carolina hurricanes (1950–1979)
