= List of storms named Gladys =

The name Gladys has been used for four tropical cyclones in the Atlantic Ocean.

- Hurricane Gladys (1955)
- Hurricane Gladys (1964)
- Hurricane Gladys (1968) – hit Cuba, Florida and Nova Scotia.
- Hurricane Gladys (1975)

The name Gladys has been also used for three tropical cyclones in the northwest Pacific Ocean.

- Typhoon Gladys (1947) (T4721)
- Typhoon Gladys (1991) (T9112, 14W) – Struck Japan and South Korea.
- Typhoon Gladys (1994) (T9417, 20W, Uding) – Struck Taiwan.
