= Tropical Storm Candy =

Atlantic tropical storm in 1968

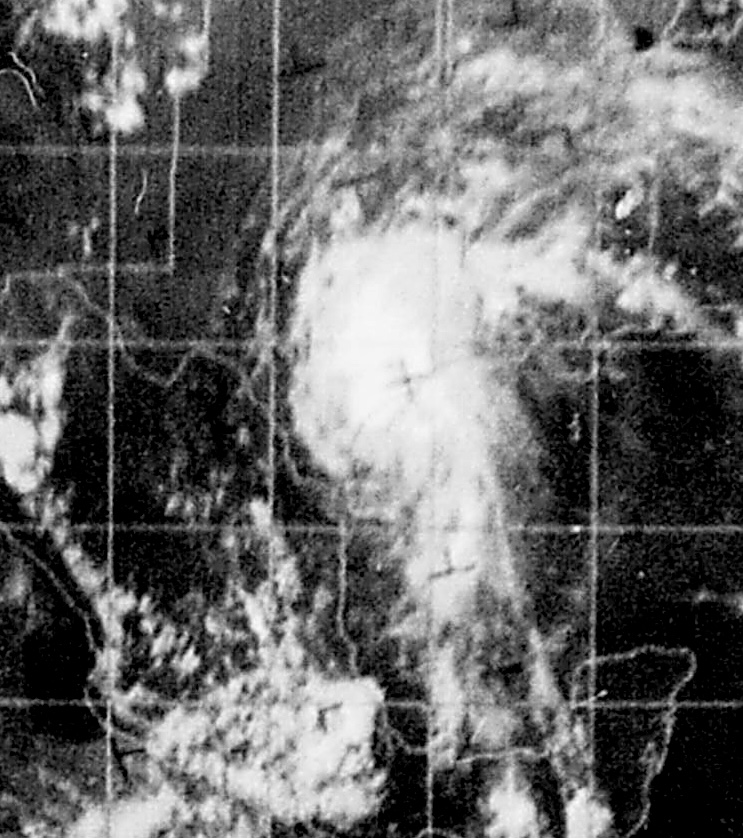
- Tropical Storm Candy shortly before landfall on June 23

Meteorological history
- Formed: June 22, 1968
- Dissipated: June 26, 1968

Tropical storm
- 1-minute sustained (SSHWS/NWS)
- Highest winds: 70 mph (110 km/h)
- Lowest pressure: 995 mbar (hPa); 29.38 inHg

Overall effects
- Damage: $2.7 million (1968 USD)
- Areas affected: Texas, Arkansas, Louisiana, Missouri, Illinois, and Ohio
- IBTrACS
- Part of the 1968 Atlantic hurricane season

Tropical Storm Candy produced minor impact in the state of Texas during the 1968 Atlantic hurricane season. The third tropical cyclone of the annual season, it developed from a tropical disturbance in the southwestern Gulf of Mexico on June 22. Gradual strengthening occurred, with the depression becoming Tropical Storm Candy on the following day. The storm reached its peak intensity of 70 mph (110 km/h) later that day and made landfall Port Aransas, Texas on June 23. Candy weakened into a tropical depression only hours after moving inland. However, the system remained a designated cyclone until June 26, at which time it completed extratropical transition over the state of Michigan.

Due to rainfall from a trough for several days, combined 11 inches (280 mm) in some areas from Candy itself, flooding occurred in eastern Texas; there was minor damage to crops, roads, and bridges. Agricultural losses alone were slightly less than $2 million (1968 USD). Storm surge along the coast of Texas caused "cuts" on Padre Island. The storm spawned 24 tornadoes, though only one caused significant impact. Candy and its remnants dropped rainfall in 24 other states, reaching as far north as New Hampshire. Overall, the system caused $2.7 million in damage and no fatalities.

== Meteorological history ==
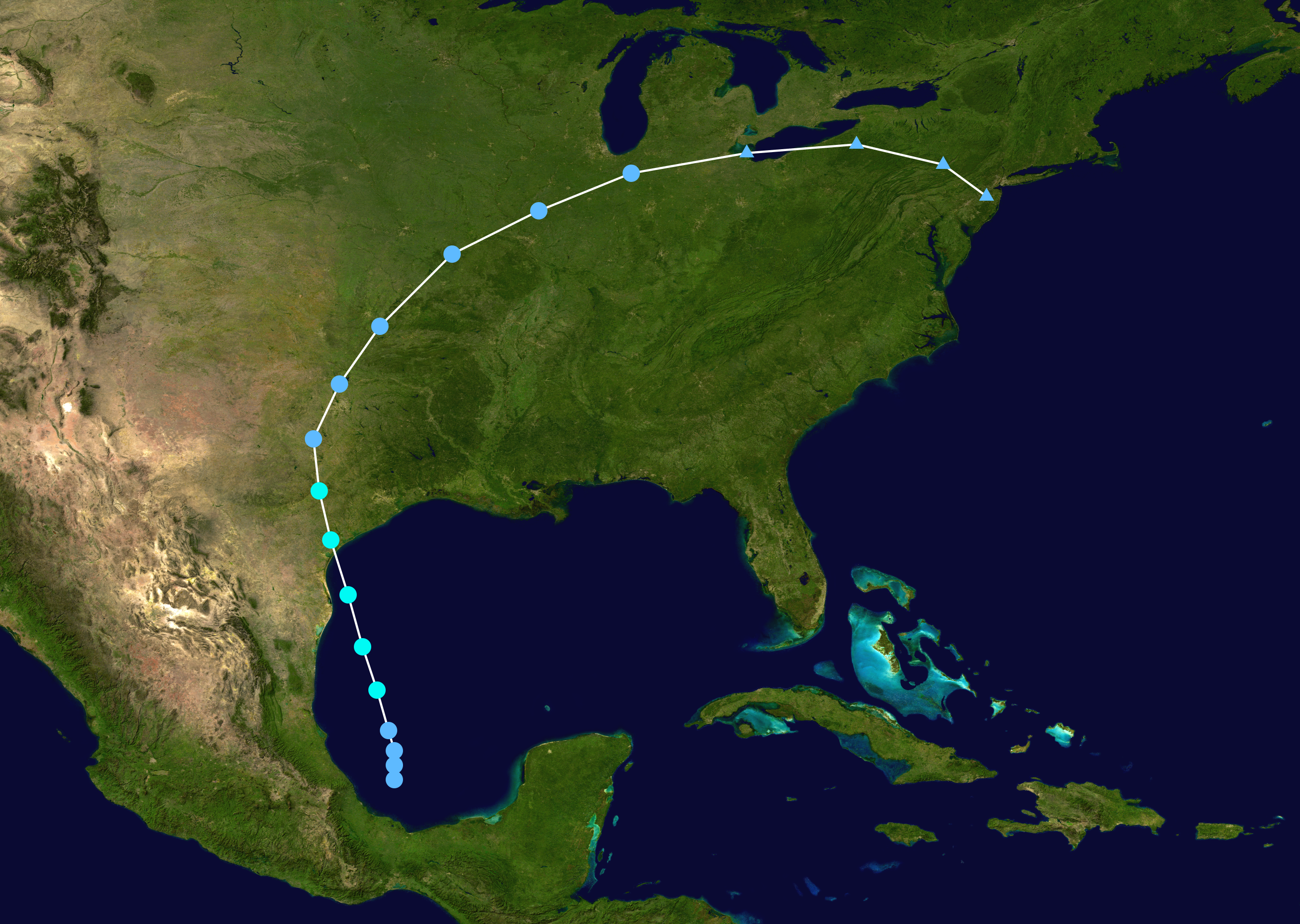
Map plotting the storm's track and intensity, according to the Saffir–Simpson scale Map key Saffir–Simpson scale Tropical depression (≤38 mph, ≤62 km/h) Tropical storm (39–73 mph, 63–118 km/h) Category 1 (74–95 mph, 119–153 km/h) Category 2 (96–110 mph, 154–177 km/h) Category 3 (111–129 mph, 178–208 km/h) Category 4 (130–156 mph, 209–251 km/h) Category 5 (≥157 mph, ≥252 km/h) Unknown Storm type Tropical cyclone Subtropical cyclone Extratropical cyclone, remnant low, tropical disturbance, or monsoon depression

Between mid- to late June, satellite imagery indicated above normal amounts of shower and thunderstorm activity over the southwestern Gulf of Mexico. By June 22, the system developed into a tropical depression just off the coast of Mexico in the Bay of Campeche. The depression, which initially had an elongated structure, moved north to north-northwestward at roughly 23 mph (37 km/h). On June 22, three separate and distinct circulation centers were noted in weather radar images from Brownsville, Texas. Later that afternoon, a United States Navy reconnaissance aircraft investigated the depression and recorded sustained winds of 50 mph (80 km/h) and a minimum barometric pressure of 1,001 mbar (29.6 inHg). Therefore, the system was upgraded to Tropical Storm Candy at 1800 UTC on that same day.

Late on June 23, Candy made landfall near Port Aransas, Texas. Despite moving ashore, Candy attained its peak intensity at 0000 UTC on June 24, with maximum sustained winds of 70 mph (110 km/h) and a minimum barometric pressure of 999 mbar (29.5 inHg). Both were observations from a weather station in Austwell, Texas. The storm quickly weakened inland, falling to tropical depression status early on June 24. In advance of a cold front, Candy curved northeastward on June 25 and began to accelerate. While moving across the Midwestern United States, the storm began to lose tropical characteristics due to the presence of cold air. At 0000 UTC on June 26, Candy transitioned into an extratropical cyclone while situated over southern Michigan. The remnants continued eastward for several more hours before dissipating over western New York.

== Impact and aftermath ==
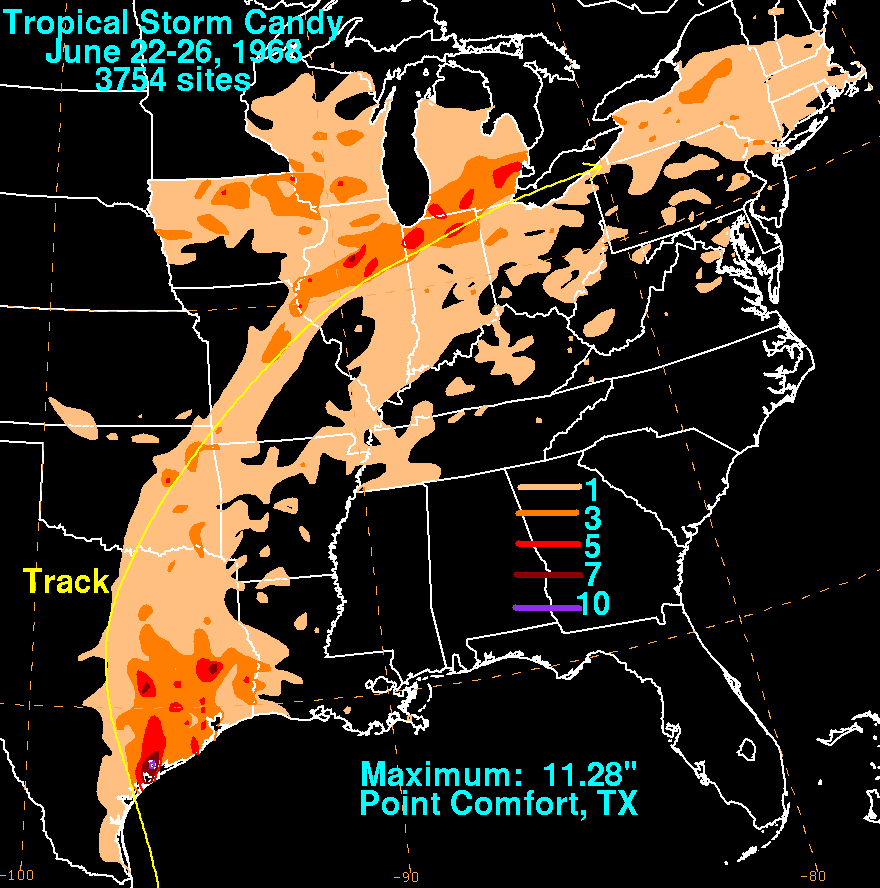
Rainfall totals for the storm

Gale-force winds were reported from Corpus Christi to Galveston, Texas. Sustained winds were above 60 mph (97 km/h) for more than an hour at Austwell, Texas. The peak wind gust of 71 mph (114 km/h) was measured at Port Aransas, Texas, where the storm made landfall. Storm surge was highest in San Antonio and Corpus Christi Bays, at 4 feet (1.2 m), and was 2 to 3 feet (0.61 to 0.91 m) along the rest of the Texas coast. However, damage from the storm surge was confined to the formation of "cuts" along Padre Island and to coastal oil refinery equipment.

Prior to the formation of Candy, a trough had brought eight to ten days of rainfall throughout Texas which helped the heavy rainfall from the storm produced damage to crops, roads, and bridges throughout eastern Texas. The rains from Candy also caused flooding on many middle and upper coastal rivers with significant damage confined to the eastern and western forks of the San Jacinto River. The highest recorded rainfall was 11.28 inches (287 mm) at Point Comfort, Texas. Elsewhere in southeast Texas, precipitation amounts were generally 3 to 6 inches (76 to 152 mm). Impact from winds was mostly minor, except at the 740 feet (230 m) public fishing pier in Port O'Connor, which was severely damaged by 65 mph (100 km/h) winds. Ten towboats and barges, as well as several other small vessels, received minor impacts at Hopper's Landing on San Antonio Bay.

Outside of Texas, 2 to 4 inches (51 to 102 mm) of rain was reported in eastern Oklahoma, northwestern Arkansas, central Missouri, and northern Illinois. Precipitation in Michigan exceeded 6 inches (150 mm) in some areas, contributing to the ongoing flooding event in Ann Arbor. Flash flooding was reported in western New York, due to precipitation amounts up to 3.04 inches (77 mm) in Buffalo during a 24–hour period. As a result, streams overflowed their banks, inundating many basements, sewers, and underpasses. While tropical, Candy spawned 19 tornadoes or funnel-clouds to form between June 23 and 25. Ten were reported in Texas, five in Arkansas, three in Louisiana, and one in Missouri. Five additional tornadoes, which were associated with the extratropical remnants of Candy, were reported on June 25 in eastern Ohio. Despite the amount of tornadoes, only one caused significant damage. That tornado "nearly demolished" a school in Morning Star, Arkansas. The total property damage from the storm was "conservatively" estimated at $1 million, while losses to agriculture in eastern Texas approached $2 million. No deaths were reported in relation to the storm.

== See also ==
- 1960 Texas tropical storm
- Tropical Storm Grace (2003)
- Tropical Storm Hermine (2010)
