= Hurricane Gladys (1968) =

Category 2 Atlantic hurricane in 1968

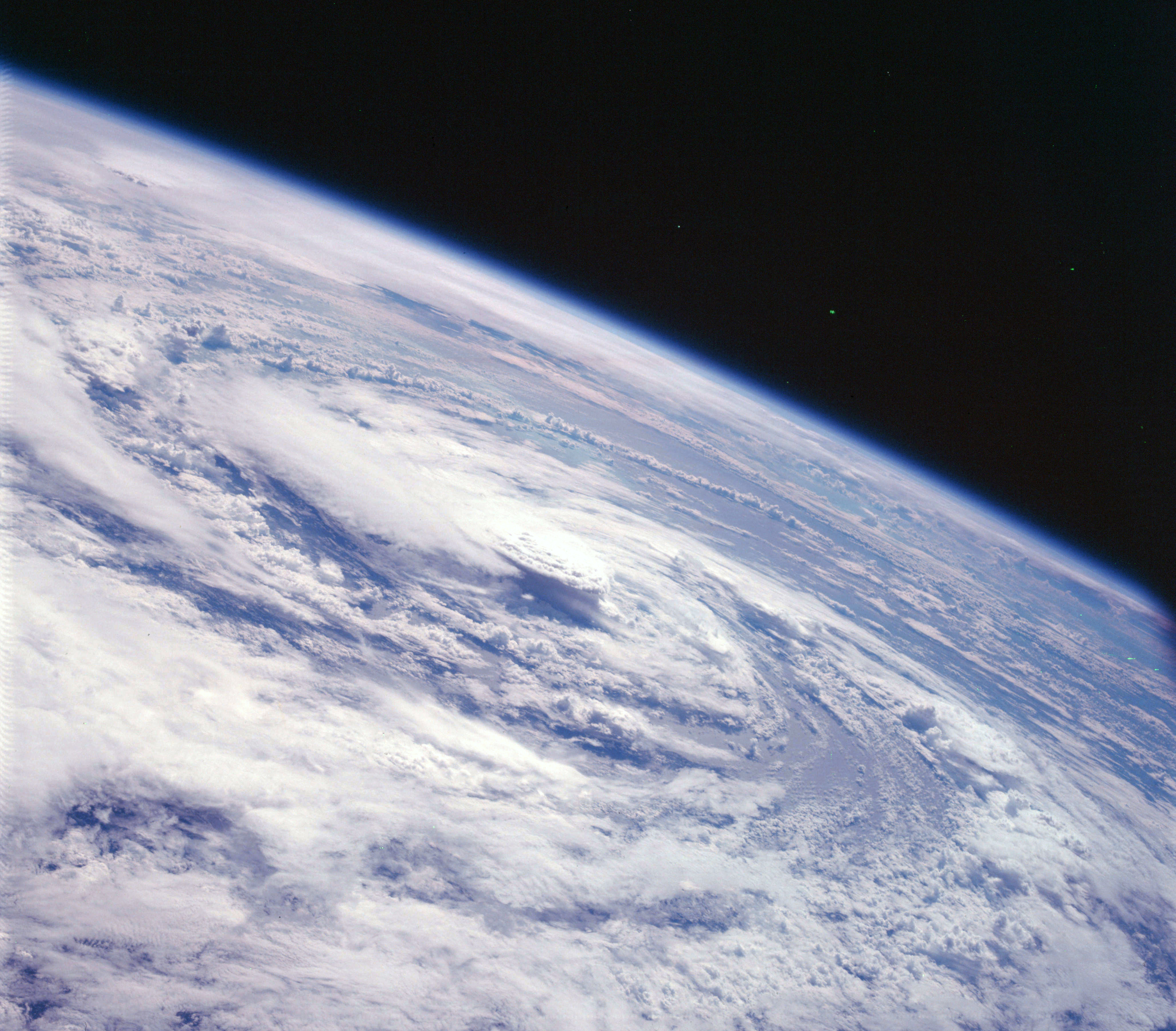
- Gladys as seen from Apollo 7 over the Gulf of Mexico on October 17

Meteorological history
- Formed: October 13, 1968
- Dissipated: October 21, 1968

Category 2 hurricane
- 1-minute sustained (SSHWS/NWS)
- Highest winds: 100 mph (155 km/h)
- Lowest pressure: 965 mbar (hPa); 28.50 inHg

Overall effects
- Fatalities: 11
- Damage: $18.7 million (1968 USD)
- Areas affected: Cuba, Southeastern United States (especially Florida), Nova Scotia
- IBTrACS
- Part of the 1968 Atlantic hurricane season

Hurricane Gladys was the first Atlantic hurricane to be observed each by the hurricane hunters, radar imagery, and photographs from space. The seventh named storm and fifth hurricane (including one unnamed hurricane) of the 1968 season, Gladys formed on October 13 in the western Caribbean from a broad disturbance related to a tropical wave. The storm moved north-northwestward, becoming a hurricane before striking Cuba on October 16. Gladys later reached peak winds of 100 mph (160 km/h) just before making landfall near Homosassa on the western coast of Florida on October 19. The hurricane crossed the state and continued northeastward, passing just east of Cape Hatteras on October 20. The next day, Gladys became extratropical and was absorbed by a cold front over Nova Scotia.

In Cuba, the threat of the hurricane prompted widespread evacuations. Gladys caused flash flooding and heavily damaged the tobacco crop. Damage in the country was estimated at $12 million (1968 USD), and there were six deaths. While passing west of the Florida Keys, the hurricane produced strong winds that briefly cut communications to the Dry Tortugas, but damage was minor. Near where Gladys made landfall, winds gusted to 100 mph (160 km/h) and tides reached 6.5 ft (2.0 m) above normal. There was heavy beach erosion and flooding along the coast, while the winds knocked down trees and caused power outages. Across the state, damage was estimated at $6.7 million (1968 USD), and three people were indirectly killed. Heavy rainfall in South Carolina caused minor river flooding. When paralleling just off the coast of North Carolina, Gladys was responsible for breaking the state's worst drought since 1932, and proved more beneficial than the minor storm damage there. Later, Gladys killed two people in Atlantic Canada and caused coastal damage in Prince Edward Island.

== Meteorological history ==
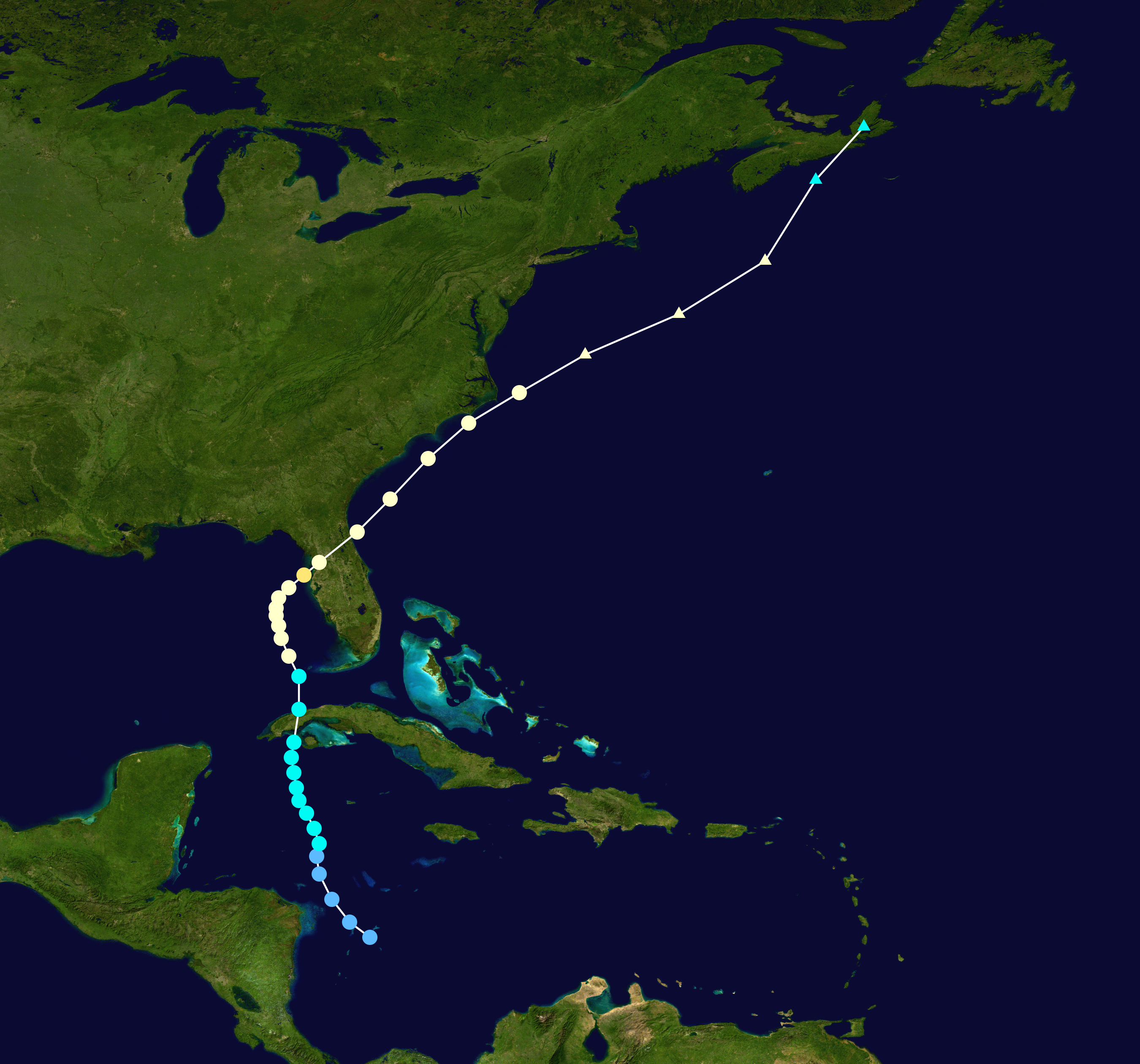
Map plotting the storm's track and intensity, according to the Saffir–Simpson scale Map key Saffir–Simpson scale Tropical depression (≤38 mph, ≤62 km/h) Tropical storm (39–73 mph, 63–118 km/h) Category 1 (74–95 mph, 119–153 km/h) Category 2 (96–110 mph, 154–177 km/h) Category 3 (111–129 mph, 178–208 km/h) Category 4 (130–156 mph, 209–251 km/h) Category 5 (≥157 mph, ≥252 km/h) Unknown Storm type Tropical cyclone Subtropical cyclone Extratropical cyclone, remnant low, tropical disturbance, or monsoon depression

The origins of Hurricane Gladys were from a tropical wave – a trough embedded in the trade winds – that moved across the Lesser Antilles on October 6. For the next few days, the wave moved across the Caribbean without any development. As the wave interacted with the Intertropical Convergence Zone, a large area of convection persisted across the region, spawning a series of low-pressure areas. One became a tropical depression near Swan Island offshore Honduras on October 11, and two days later another tropical depression formed near San Andrés island in the extreme southwestern Caribbean. The latter system, which would eventually become Gladys, moved slowly north-northwestward. An anticyclone in the region caused wind shear to decrease, allowing for gradual development. On October 15, a hurricane hunters flight observed winds of 52 mph (84 km/h); on that basis, the National Hurricane Center (NHC) upgraded the depression to Tropical Storm Gladys. Gladys's track and origin were fairly typical of October.

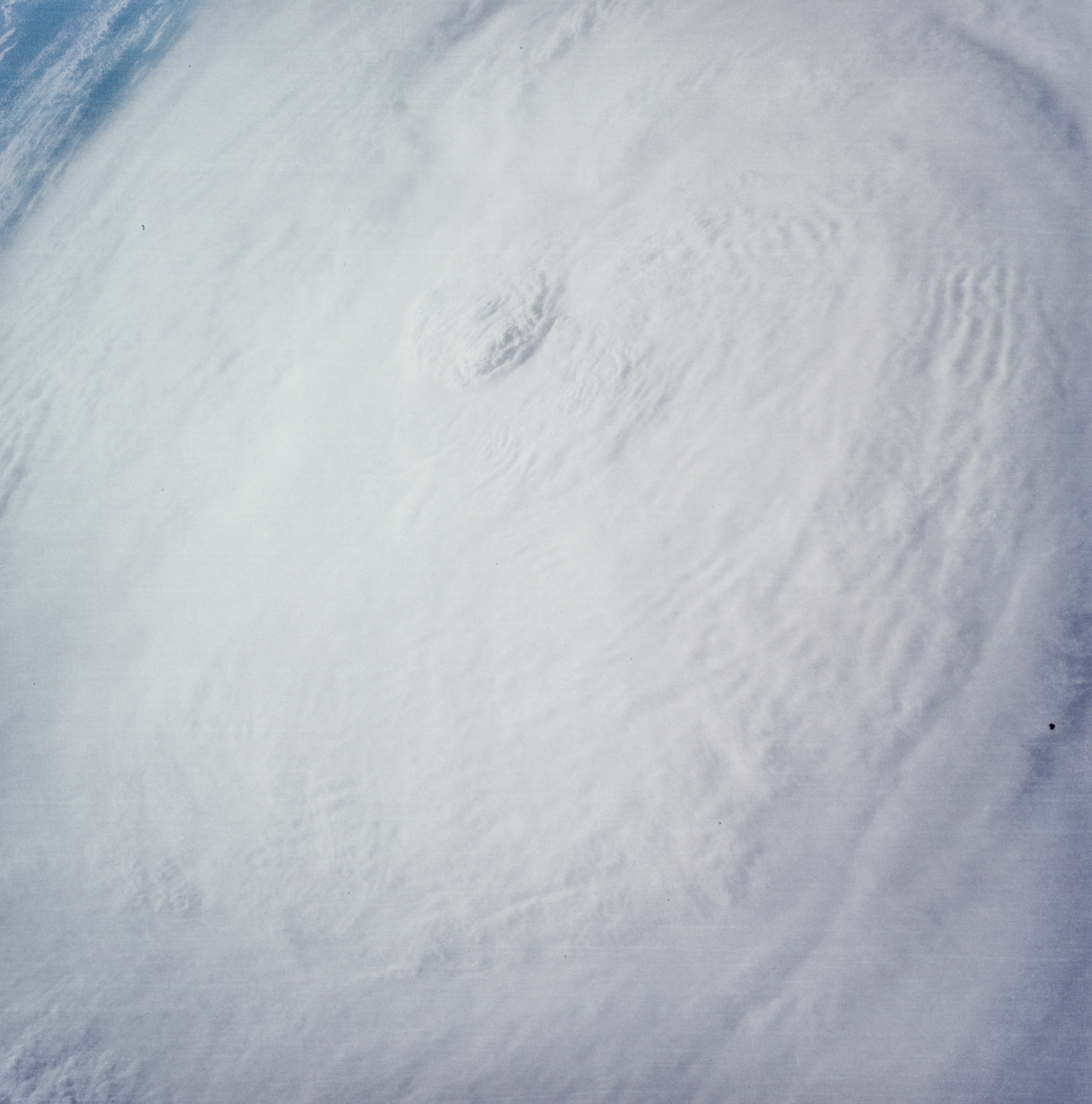
Another photograph of Hurricane Gladys by Apollo 7 at a different angle on October 17

After becoming a tropical storm, Gladys intensified into a hurricane near the Isle of Youth on October 16. Shortly thereafter it crossed the narrow but mountainous region of western Cuba. By the time the hurricane reached the southeastern Gulf of Mexico, a deep trough was moving eastward through the United States toward a weak anticyclone off the east coast. Gladys turned more to the north, passing just west of the Dry Tortugas, before resuming its north-northwest trajectory, possibly due to a mid-level low near Alabama. Around that time, the eye was reorganizing offshore southwestern Florida, and the hurricane failed to intensify significantly due to the eastern portion of the circulation being over the state. Early on October 19, Gladys made landfall near Homosassa after turning to the northeast, with peak winds estimated at 100 mph (160 km/h). It accelerated across the state due to the approaching trough, emerging into the Atlantic near St. Augustine. Paralleling the southeastern coast of the United States, Gladys passed just east of Cape Hatteras on October 20, although by that time the strongest winds remained along the eastern periphery. The approaching trough caused Gladys to gradually lose tropical characteristics, and on October 21 Gladys became extratropical just south of Nova Scotia. A few hours later, the former hurricane was absorbed by the cold front.

Hurricane Gladys was active during the Apollo 7 spaceflight mission, and astronauts aboard took several pictures of the hurricane. Later, researchers were able to compare the photographs to airforce reconnaissance data, radar, and local weather networks, the first such hurricane to be observed with such varied data.

== Preparations ==
In advance of the storm, Cuban officials forced about 36,000 residents to evacuate from low-lying areas, along with 35,000 livestock. All flights were canceled in and out of Havana during the storm's passage. Many classes were canceled in the region, and workers took steps to minimize damage to the tobacco crop.

Shortly after Gladys became a tropical storm, the NHC issued gale warnings for the Florida Keys and later a hurricane watch for the southwest Florida coast from the Florida Keys to Clearwater. After Gladys entered the Gulf of Mexico, the NHC issued hurricane warnings for the Florida Keys to Cedar Key, with a watch to St. Marks. Later, hurricane warnings were issued from Charleston, South Carolina to Hatteras, North Carolina. Before Gladys made landfall in Florida, all schools in Pinellas County were closed, and officials evacuated 60 jet fighters from MacDill Air Force Base to Mississippi. HMS Sirius, which was visiting St. Petersburg, rode out the storm in the open Gulf of Mexico. The American Red Cross opened shelters across western Florida for people to stay in during the storm, and about 40,000 people evacuated their homes during the storm's passage. Then-governor Claude R. Kirk Jr. ordered 100 Florida guardsmen to assist with storm work. Shelters were set up in North Carolina, although few people evacuated.

== Impact ==
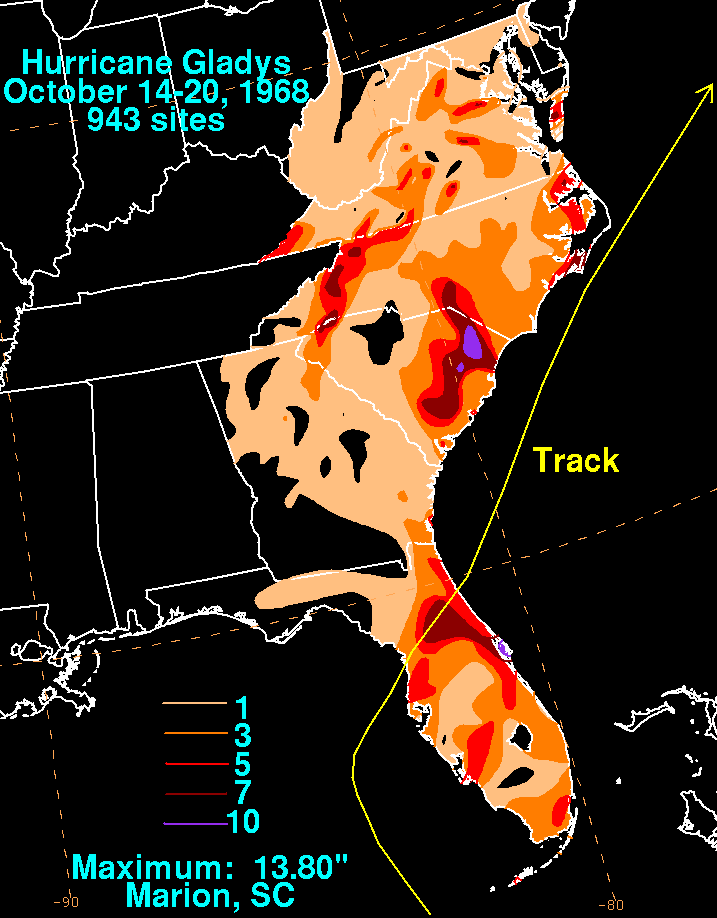
Rainfall from Hurricane Gladys in the United States

Before its first landfall in Cuba, Gladys produced wind gusts of 80 mph (130 km/h) at Nueva Gerona on the Isle of Youth. Rainfall on the island was estimated at 8.49 in (216 mm). On the Cuban mainland, a station in Havana reported gale-force winds for several hours. The hurricane dropped heavy rainfall, causing flash flooding that damaged factories and crops; the tobacco crop sustained heavy losses to the extent that the Monthly Weather Review described it as "virtually wiped out". In Havana, floodwaters from the storm wrecked houses and other buildings, while in San Antonio de los Baños, residents required rescue from their flooded houses. After the storm, Cuban officials advised residents in Havana to boil their water to prevent the spread of disease, after water lines were damaged. At least 36,000 people were left homeless as a result of the storm. Throughout Cuba, Gladys caused $12 million in damage and six deaths.

While Gladys was still moving northward offshore Florida, it produced winds of 64 mph (103 km/h) on the Dry Tortugas, with gusts to 86 mph (138 km/h). Rainfall on the Dry Tortugas reached over 4 in (100 mm). Communications were briefly cut to the island during the storm. Along the Florida Keys, the only other report of a hurricane-force wind gust was 87 mph (140 km/h) on Plantation Key. Tides in the Florida Keys were about 0.6 ft (0.18 m) above normal, and damage was minor in the region. As the storm paralleled Southwest Florida, it produced negligible impact between Sarasota and Naples.

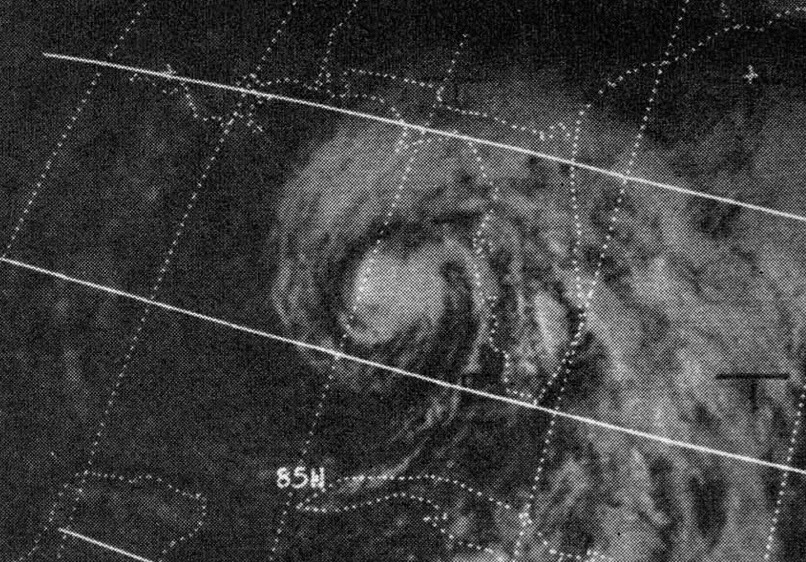
ESSA-7 Satellite imagery of Hurricane Gladys approaching the West Coast of Florida on October 17

Farther north in Florida, hurricane-force winds were limited to a small area from Clearwater to Bayport, with peak gusts of 100 mph (160 km/h). A weather station at Inglis clocked sustained winds of 94 mph (151 km/h) before being disabled. Winds in eastern Florida were not as strong. Gladys produced moderate rainfall across the state, peaking at 12.46 in (316 mm) at Cape Canaveral. Rainfall was generally less than 6 in (150 mm), which limited flooding. The hurricane produced high tides near where it made landfall, reaching 6.5 ft (2.0 m) above normal; this caused heavy beach erosion and coastal flooding. The town of Sunset Beach was almost entirely under water during the high storm tides. Elsewhere, the high waves wrecked boat houses, and portions of the seawall were washed out in Tierra Verde.

Across Florida, Gladys downed many trees and power lines, and the NHC office briefly lost power for two hours. Gladys affected about 85% of the citrus crop to some degree, although crop damage was fairly minimal, with about 10% lost in Pinellas and west Pasco counties. There was widespread property damage due to the strong winds, particularly to mobile homes. Strong winds in Pinellas County knocked over trailers and damaged billboards. In Ocala, most roads were blocked by fallen trees and power lines. Falling trees revealed liquor bottles and other archeological relics from the period of the Second Seminole War at Fort King in Ocala. Wind damage was minor in northeastern Florida, despite a wind gust of 74 mph (119 km/h) in Jacksonville.

Gladys also spawned at least three tornadoes in the state, one each in Boca Raton, Palatka, and Whitfield Estates. The one in Boca Raton damaged a warehouse, while a waterspout in Whitfield Estates damaged three homes. The Palatka twister caused minimal damage. According to locals, several other tornadoes were suspected to have touched down in Volusia and Putnam counties, based on the falling of trees and visible twisting trail of damage. Two people died in the state due to storm-induced heart attacks, and another person died after driving into a flooded ditch. Damage in the state totaled $6.7 million, mostly to private property, and due to the damage, portions of the state were later declared a federal disaster area. The Small Business Administration authorized low-interest loans to homes and businesses damaged during the storm.

Outside of Florida, Gladys produced rainfall through Delaware, with a maximum of 13.80 in (351 mm) in Marion, South Carolina. In the state, the rains caused minor river flooding and left minor damage to the cotton crop, while high tides eroded beaches. In North Carolina, wind gusts peaked at 90 mph (140 km/h) at Cape Lookout, while sustained winds reached 63 mph (101 km/h) at Nags Head before the anemometer blew away. The strongest winds were only along the immediate coastline due to the hurricane passing offshore. Gladys produced above-normal tides of 2 to 4 ft (0.61 to 1.22 m). The storm knocked two houses off their foundations and severely damaged a business and a mobile home. Rainfall in the state helped end break the worst drought since 1932, and the minimal storm damage was offset by the beneficial precipitation. In southeastern Virginia, the fringes of the storm produced wind gusts of 46 mph (74 km/h) and light rainfall in Norfolk. Farther inland, rains from Gladys caused the Roanoke River to rise 9 ft (2.7 m) near Roanoke, just below flood stage. Tides were about 2 ft (0.61 m) above normal in the state, low enough to prevent major coastal flooding.

Later, the extratropical remnants of Gladys produced beneficial rainfall of 2 to 4 in (51 to 102 mm) over Atlantic Canada, peaking at 5.03 in (128 mm) in New Brunswick. In the province, the former hurricane also produced 1.38 in (35 mm) of snow in Upsalquitch. Precipitation from the storm spread as far west as Quebec and as far northeast as Newfoundland, causing flooding in New Brunswick and Nova Scotia. Wind gusts in the latter province peaked at 65 mph (105 km/h) in Sydney. Along Cape Breton Island, the remnants of Gladys killed one person and injured four. In Prince Edward Island, wind gusts reached 85 mph (135 km/h) in Charlottetown, strong enough to knock over a tree and kill a man driving in Alberton. The storm washed out a portion of a bridge near Alberton and part of a wharf in Miminegash, and damaged 35 boats. Ferry service was disrupted between the Canadian Maritime provinces.

== See also ==
- Hurricane Irene (1999) – a hurricane that took a similar track, causing moderate damage throughout its path
- Other storms with the same name
- List of Florida hurricanes (1950–1974)
- List of Category 2 Atlantic hurricanes
