= Hurricane Easy (1950) =

Category 3 Atlantic hurricane in 1950

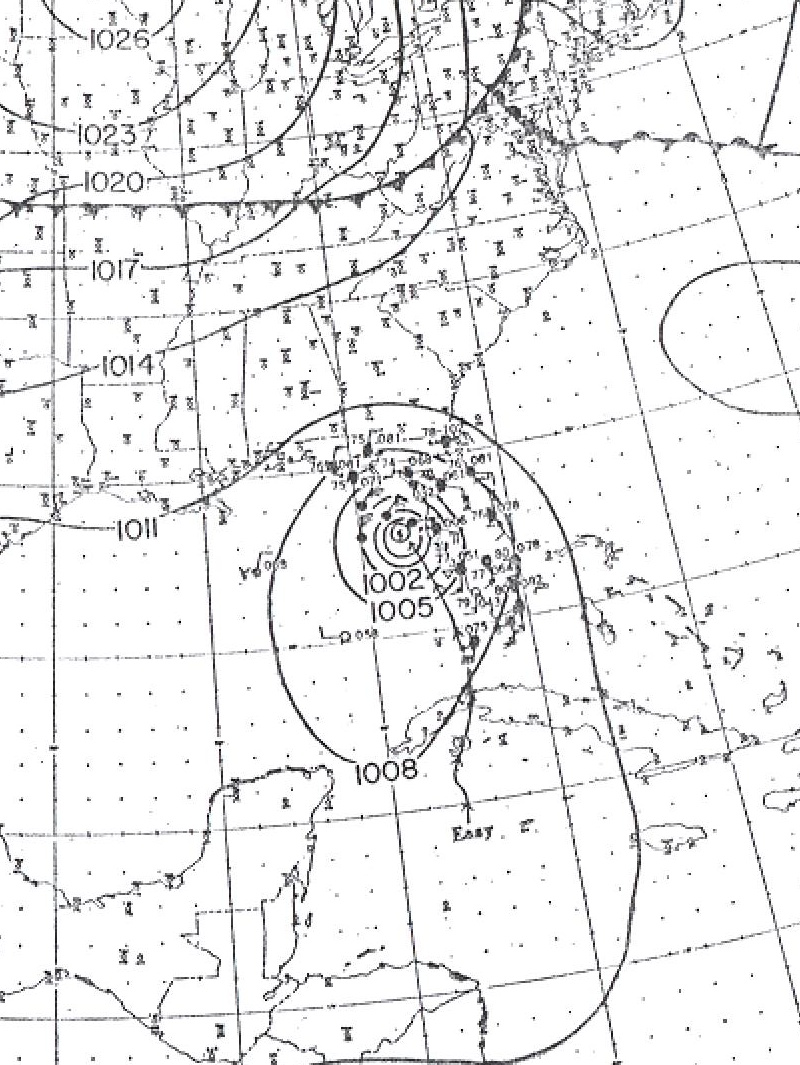
- Surface weather analysis showing Easy on September 4

Meteorological history
- Formed: September 1, 1950
- Dissipated: September 9, 1950

Category 3 major hurricane
- 1-minute sustained (SSHWS/NWS)
- Highest winds: 120 mph (195 km/h)
- Lowest pressure: 958 mbar (hPa); 28.29 inHg

Overall effects
- Fatalities: 2 indirect
- Damage: $3.3 million (1950 USD)
- Areas affected: Cuba, Florida, Georgia
- IBTrACS
- Part of the 1950 Atlantic hurricane season

Hurricane Easy was the fifth tropical storm, hurricane, and major hurricane of the 1950 Atlantic hurricane season. The hurricane developed in the western Caribbean Sea on September 1, and tracked northeastward. After crossing Cuba, the hurricane rapidly strengthened in the eastern Gulf of Mexico to reach peak winds of 120 mph (200 km/h). Easy executed a cyclonic loop, moved northeastward to hit near Cedar Key, Florida, executed a second loop, and hit western Florida again. After rapidly weakening over Florida, the hurricane turned to the northwest, and ultimately dissipated over northeastern Arkansas on September 9. From the point when Hurricane Easy entered the Gulf of Mexico until it weakened to a tropical storm, it was observed nearly constantly from radars or reconnaissance aircraft.

Easy is the most recent major hurricane to strike the Homosassa, Florida, area. Due to the hurricane remaining near the northwest Florida coast for an extended period of time, Easy produced severe rainfall and strong waves, resulting in heavy damage in the Cedar Key area. Hurricane Easy was one of two major hurricanes to strike Florida during the year; the other was Hurricane King, which affected Miami.

== Meteorological history ==
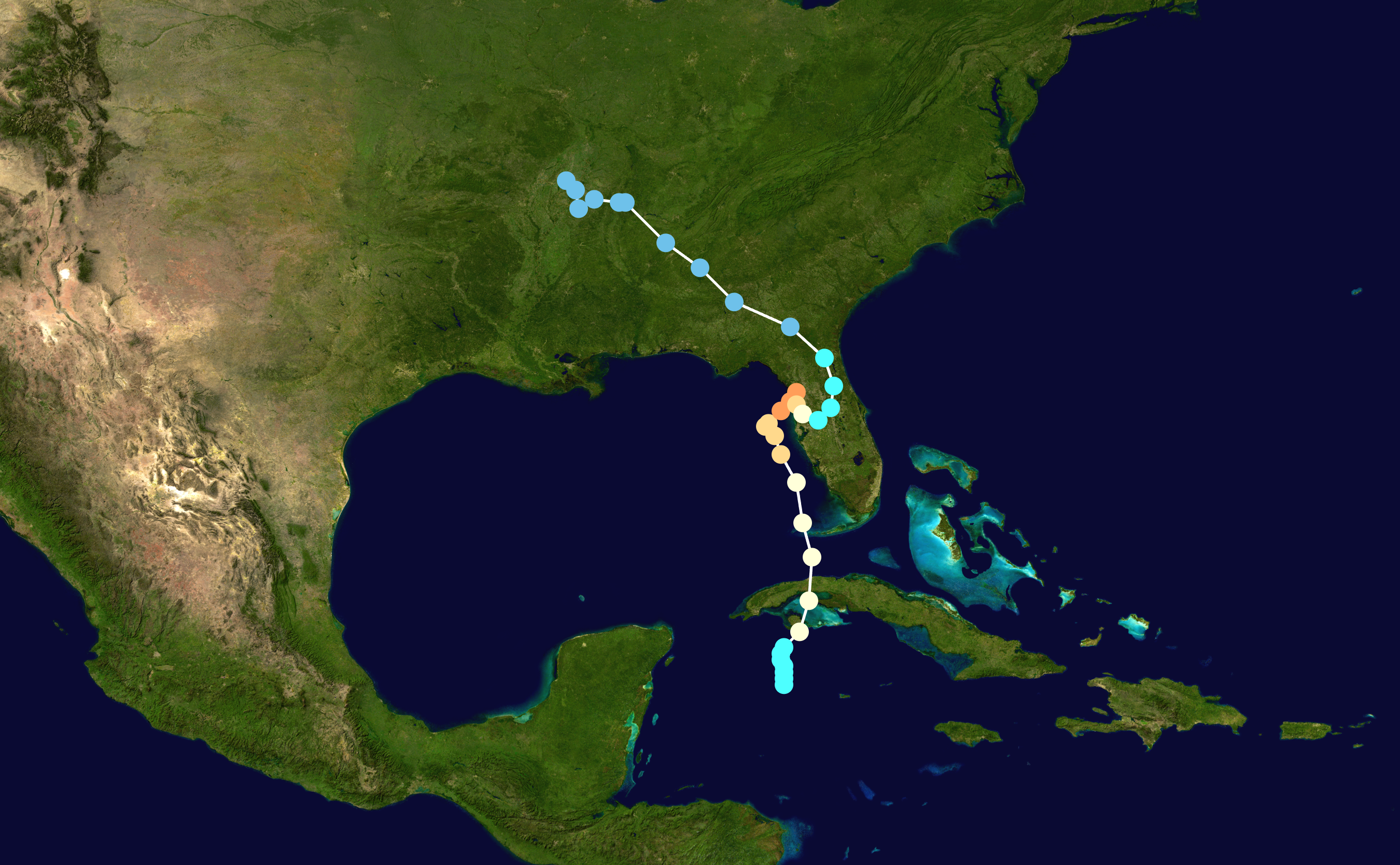
Map plotting the storm's track and intensity, according to the Saffir–Simpson scale Map key Saffir–Simpson scale Tropical depression (≤38 mph, ≤62 km/h) Tropical storm (39–73 mph, 63–118 km/h) Category 1 (74–95 mph, 119–153 km/h) Category 2 (96–110 mph, 154–177 km/h) Category 3 (111–129 mph, 178–208 km/h) Category 4 (130–156 mph, 209–251 km/h) Category 5 (≥157 mph, ≥252 km/h) Unknown Storm type Tropical cyclone Subtropical cyclone Extratropical cyclone, remnant low, tropical disturbance, or monsoon depression

Following the passage of Hurricane Baker through the Caribbean Sea, a trough of low pressure persisted across the western Caribbean Sea. On August 31, convection became more concentrated to the south of the Isle of Youth, and on September 1 the disturbance developed into a tropical storm; it was later given the name "Easy", as part of the United States Weather Bureau naming tropical cyclones with the Joint Army/Navy Phonetic Alphabet. A developing anticyclone and moist air over the region provided favorable conditions for intensification, as the storm tracked slowly northeastward. On September 2, Tropical Storm Easy attained hurricane status about 50 miles (85 km) south of the Isle of Youth.

After crossing the Isle of Youth, Hurricane Easy strengthened slightly while continuing northeastward, and the storm struck the Matanzas Province of Cuba with winds of 80 mph (130 km/h). The hurricane quickly crossed the island, passing just east of Havana before reaching the southeastern Gulf of Mexico on September 3. After entering the Gulf of Mexico, Easy turned to the north-northwest, paralleling the Florida coastline a short distance offshore while producing hurricane-force winds onshore. On September 4, the hurricane quickly strengthened to reach peak winds of 120 mph (190 km/h), an intensity it would retain for 18 hours. That day, a ridge of high pressure strengthened to the north of the storm, leaving weaker steering currents. This caused Hurricane Easy to execute a counter-clockwise loop to the west of Tampa, Florida.

After executing its first loop, Hurricane Easy moved northeastward at 7 mph (11 km/h) until making landfall near Cedar Key on September 5 with winds of 120 mph (190 km/h). Steering currents again became weak, causing Easy to execute a second loop in 24 hours towards the southeast. After briefly emerging into the Gulf of Mexico, the hurricane made its final landfall on Homosassa Springs to the north of Tampa, and rapidly weakened to a tropical storm over land. Easy turned to the northeast, which was followed by a turn to the northwest as the storm neared the Atlantic coast. On September 7, Easy crossed into Georgia, and shortly thereafter it weakened to a tropical depression. The depression continued northwestward for two days until dissipating over extreme northeastern Arkansas on September 9. The reason for its erratic track, including the two loops, is unknown, although it is potentially due to a Fujiwhara interaction with Hurricane Dog to its east.

== Preparations and impact ==
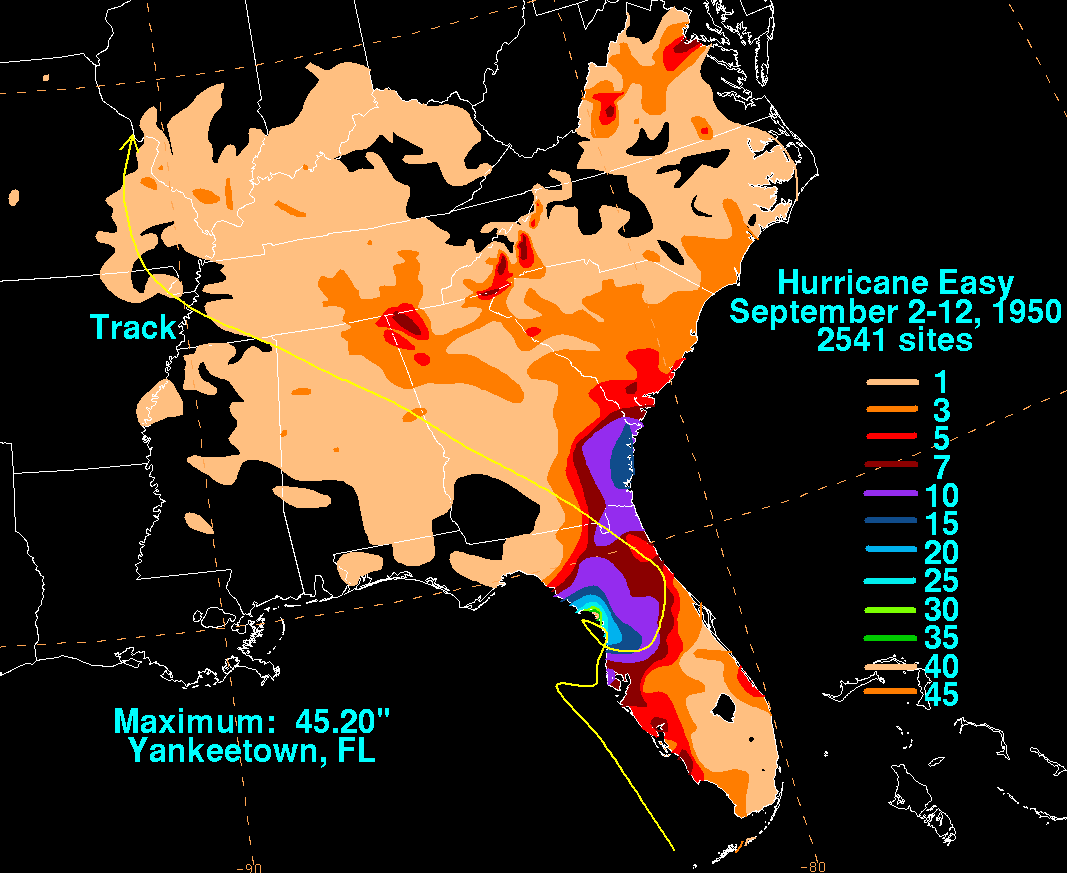
Easy's Rainfall across the United States

The hurricane crossed over western Cuba with winds of up to 80 mph (130 km/h); however, damage was minor, and no deaths occurred in the country. In Havana, winds decreased to 15 mph (24 km/h) as the eye of the hurricane crossed over the city.

With an eye ranging from 18 mi (29 km) to 25 mi (40 km) in diameter, the hurricane was well-tracked throughout its lifetime by radars at the University of Florida and by Reconnaissance Aircraft. Despite its unusual track, the Weather Bureau issued hurricane warnings in a timely manner, though warnings were issued for a larger area than those that actually experienced hurricane-force winds. In the Florida Keys, winds from Easy reached 72 mph (116 km/h), which downed trees and power lines, littering local streets with debris. Heavy seas moved around a Navy barge, though no damage was reported.

Hurricane Easy produced hurricane-force winds across large portions of western Florida, including over 100 mph (160 km/h) winds in Cedar Key for 9 and 1/2 hours. The town, which reported a minimum pressure of 958.3 mbar (28.30 in), experienced the eye of the hurricane for 2 and 1/2 hours while strong waves hit the coast. The tide in Tampa Bay rose 6.5 ft (2.0 m), the highest since 1921. While looping twice along its path, the hurricane dropped heavy amounts of rainfall of 10 in (250 mm) to 20 in (510 mm) in large portions of northwestern Florida. Rainfall totals include 24.5 in (620 mm) in Cedar Key in 3 days and 38.70 in (983 mm) in Yankeetown, Florida, in 24 hours, which easily became the largest 24‑hour rainfall total on record for the United States. The record has since been broken by Tropical Storm Claudette in 1979 with 43 in (1,100 mm), though Easy's total remains the largest 24‑hour rainfall total on record for the state of Florida.

Hurricane Easy was described as the worst hurricane in the Cedar Key area in 70 years. The hurricane left half of the houses destroyed or unfit for rehabilitation, while 90% of the others were damaged. The strong winds destroyed the roofs of 150 homes and buildings. The rainfall caused severe flooding that resulted in crop damage. Easy was indirectly responsible for two deaths due to electrocutions. In addition, 27 people were injured from the hurricane. The strong waves destroyed the fishing community's entire fishing fleet of 100 boats, which was the town's entire livelihood. The town's main employment center, a broom and brush plant, was severely damaged, and would close two years after the hurricane. The hurricane also produced severe damage in Pinellas and Hillsborough Counties in the Tampa area. Throughout Florida, damages totaled $3.3 million (1950 USD), a lower than expected total due to the sparse population in the area of the worst damage. After the storm's passage throughout central and northern Florida, "blisters" developed on hundreds of cars; the locations affected reported that the blisters formed on the surface of vehicles shortly after Easy retreated. The following day, the blisters disappeared. Researchers later created several theories as to the unusual occurrence, though they concluded that air pockets under the layer of paint expanded as a result of the decreased barometric pressure.

Heavy rainfall from Hurricane Easy continued into Georgia and occurred throughout the state. The precipitation was most intense and destructive along Georgia's coast, damaging crops and vegetation after waterlogging fields. In some areas, 5–9 in (125–225 mm) of rain was recorded in a single day.

== See also ==
- Other storms named Easy
- List of wettest tropical cyclones in the United States
- List of Florida hurricanes (1950–1974)
