= List of Florida hurricanes (1950–1974) =

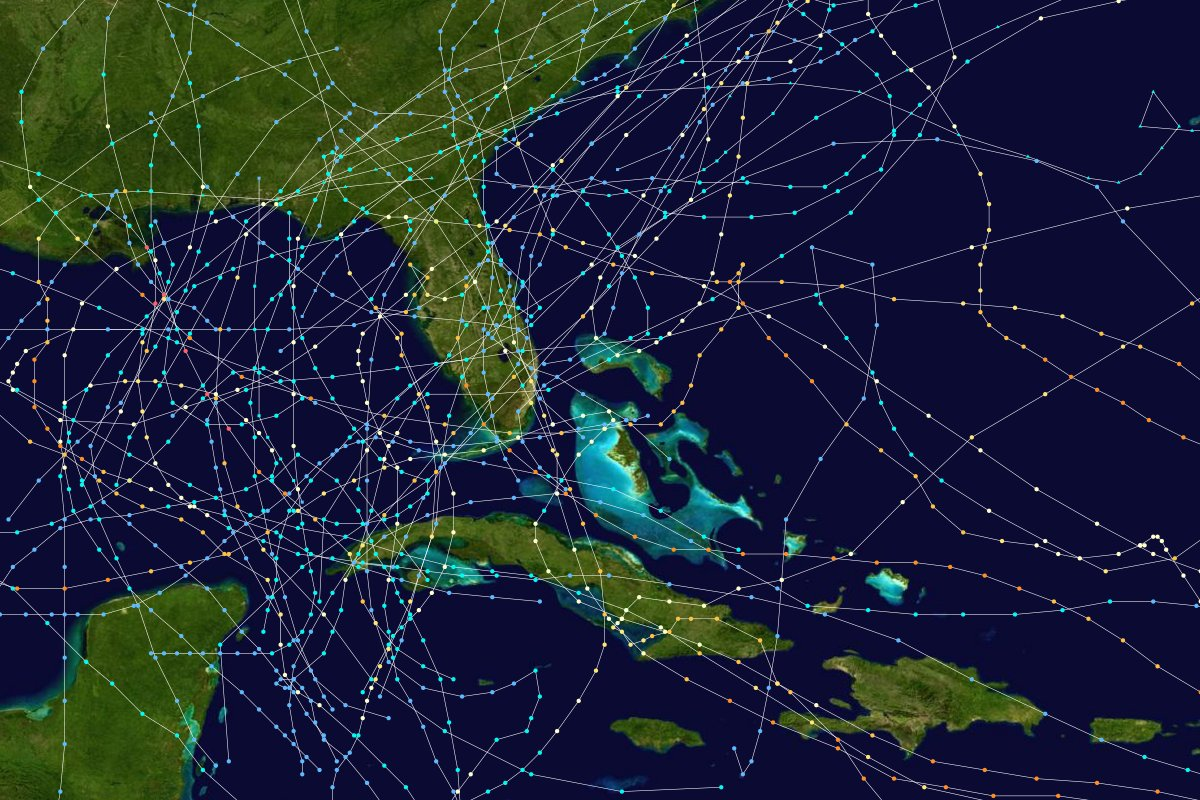
Tracks of hurricanes over Florida from 1950 to 1974

85 Atlantic tropical or subtropical cyclones have affected the U.S. state of Florida from 1950 to 1974. Collectively, tropical cyclones in Florida during the time period resulted in about $7.04 billion (2017 USD) in damage, primarily from Hurricanes Donna and Dora. Additionally, tropical cyclones in Florida were directly responsible for 93 fatalities during the period, as well as responsible for 23 indirect deaths. Several tropical cyclones produced over 20 inches (500 mm) of rainfall in the state, including Hurricane Easy which is the highest total during the time period. The 1969 season was the year with the most tropical cyclones affecting the state, with a total of 8 systems. The 1954 and 1967 seasons were the only years during the time period in which a storm did not affect the state.

The strongest hurricane to hit the state during the time period was Donna in 1960, which was the 8th strongest hurricane on record to strike the United States. Additionally, Hurricanes Easy, King, Isbell, and Betsy hit the state as major hurricanes.

== 1950–1959 ==
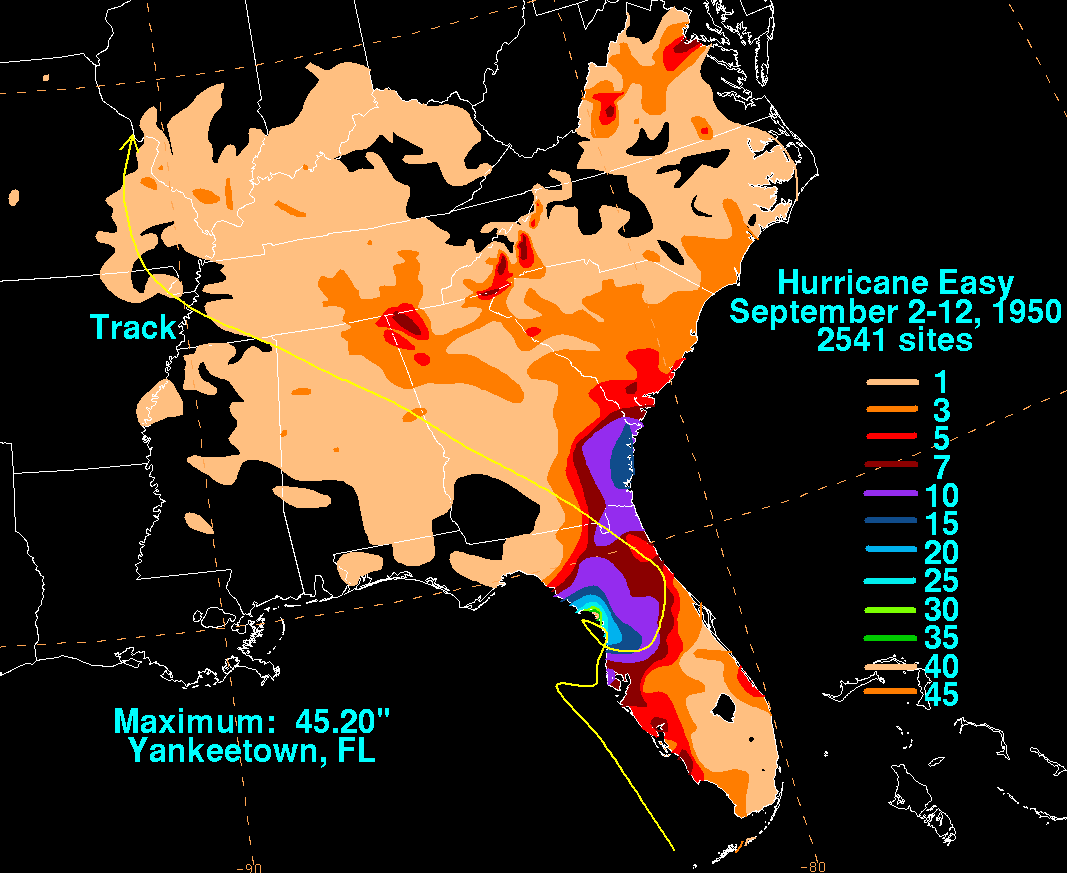
Hurricane Easy rainfall

- August 31, 1950– Hurricane Baker struck near Mobile, Alabama, with the eastern half of its circulation producing moderate damage from strong winds and two tornadoes across the Florida Panhandle. Heavy rainfall and winds also led to some crop damage.
- September 5, 1950– Hurricane Easy moved ashore near Cedar Key and later near Tampa Bay as a major hurricane after looping offshore. The hurricane caused locally heavy damage in a sparsely populated area, totaling $3.3 million (1950 USD, $29.5 million 2008 USD). Due to its erratic motion, Easy dropped heavy rainfall peaking at 45.20 in (1,148 mm) in Yankeetown, which in turn caused two indirect deaths from electrocution.
- October 18, 1950– Hurricane King made landfall on Miami as a major hurricane. Its hurricane-force winds blew out the windows of many buildings in downtown Miami, resulting in several injuries. Across the state, the storm caused three deaths and heavy damage totaling $27.8 million (1950 USD, $249 million 2008 USD), of which over half occurred in the Miami area.
- October 21, 1950– The threat of Hurricane Love resulted in hurricane evacuations along the western coastline, though dry air in the storm led to very little effects after it hit near the mouth of the Steinhatchee River.
- May 18, 1951– The outer rainbands of Hurricane Able produced light rainfall and high seas along the eastern coastline.
- October 2, 1951– Hurricane How hit Fort Myers, and produced flooding rains and winds of up to 60 miles per hour (97 km/h). The storm resulted in $2 million in damage (1951 USD, $17 million 2008 USD), which was the only reported damage in the United States during the year.
- February 3, 1952– An off-season tropical storm unofficially named the Groundhog Day tropical storm hit near Cape Sable, producing gusty winds and moderate rainfall.
- August 30, 1952– Hurricane Able recurved about 130 miles (210 km) east of the state, with the western portion of its circulation dropping 1.69 inches (43 mm) of precipitation in Jacksonville.
- June 6, 1953– Tropical Storm Alice dissipated shortly after moving ashore near Panama City, Florida, producing rainfall which broke a dry spell in the state.
- August 29, 1953– An unnamed tropical storm hit near Fort Myers. While crossing the state it dropped moderate precipitation, including 3.85 inches (98 mm) in Palm Beach.
- September 20, 1953– The seventh storm of the season hit near Yankeetown, though its impact is unknown.
- September 26, 1953– Hurricane Florence moved ashore near Destin, causing rough surf and local flooding. Overall damage was minor, and the hurricane resulted in three injuries but no deaths.
- Early October, 1953 – An unnamed tropical storm dropped light rainfall across the state.
- October 9, 1953– Tropical Storm Hazel struck Fort Myers, and produced gusty winds and additional rainfall to previously wet conditions. The passage of the storm caused flooding of low-lying areas and some rivers, with the upper region of the St. Johns River experiencing record-setting flooding.
- August 21, 1955– Tropical Storm Brenda struck southeastern Louisiana, with its outer rainbands dropping precipitation along the western Florida Panhandle.
- July 6, 1956– A tropical depression moved ashore near Pensacola, resulting in light damage and moderate precipitation.
- September 24, 1956– Hurricane Flossy hit near Destin as a minimal hurricane, resulting in gusty winds and high tides reaching 7.4 feet (2.3 m). The storm caused light damage and four indirect deaths in near Tallahassee from an airplane crash during an evacuation.
- October 15, 1956– A quasi-tropical storm made landfall near Miami and dropped moderate to heavy rainfall. The storm caused $3 million in damage (1956 USD, $24 million 2008 USD) and two deaths from drowning.
- November 1956– Rough surf from Hurricane Greta caused about $1.1 million in damage (1956 USD, $8.7 million 2008 USD) along the eastern coastline, primarily near Jacksonville.
- June 8, 1957– The first storm of the season hit near Tallahassee, dropping heavy rainfall of over 19 inches (480 mm) in Suwannee County which forced hundreds of families to evacuate. Offshore, rough waves capsized a boat and killed five, with minimal onshore damage.
- September 8, 1957– Tropical Storm Debbie moved ashore along the Florida Panhandle, causing flooding, rainfall, and four indirect deaths.
- September 4, 1958– Tropical Storm Ella emerged into the Gulf of Mexico after crossing Cuba, with its outer rainbands producing gale-force wind gusts in the Florida Keys. The winds uprooted a few trees, though damage was minor.
- June 18, 1959– An unnamed tropical depression hit near Tampa Bay and spawned at least two tornadoes, one of which caused heavy damage and many injuries in Miami. High tides and moderate rainfall caused damage, as well, and monetary damage across the state totaled $1.5 million (1959 USD, $11.1 million 2008 USD).
- October 8, 1959– Tropical Storm Irene hit near Pensacola and caused a peak wind gust of 55 miles per hour (89 km/h) as well as a storm tide reaching 4.4 feet (1.3 m) above normal. Damage was minor.
- October 18, 1959– Tropical Storm Judith struck near Fort Myers, producing light to moderate rainfall peaking at 7.9 inches (200 mm) in Miles City. Damage from the storm was minor, with no deaths and only one injury attributed to Judith.

== 1960–1969 ==
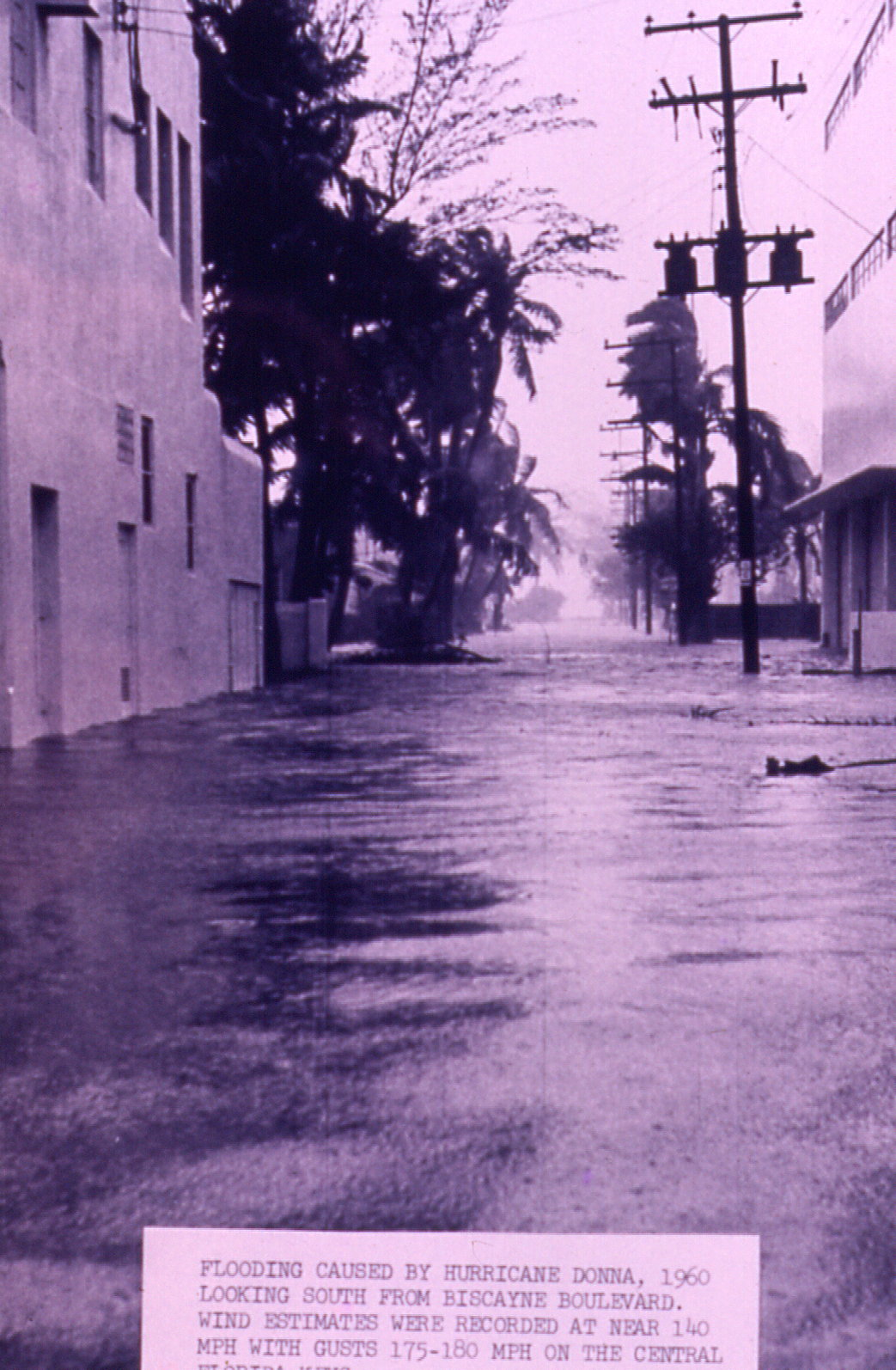
Damage from Hurricane Donna in Miami

- July 29, 1960– Tropical Storm Brenda hit near Yankeetown, producing locally heavy rainfall which reached over 13 inches (330 mm) near Tampa. The rainfall caused flooding and a few indirect traffic deaths, and damage in the state totaled $5 million (1960 USD, $36 million 2008 USD).
- September 10, 1960– Hurricane Donna struck near Cape Sable after crossing the Florida Keys, and after briefly emerging into the Gulf of Mexico made its final landfall near Fort Myers. It left a path of destruction across the entire peninsula, including destroying 30% of the state's grapefruit crop and leveling over half of the mangrove trees in the Everglades. The passage of the hurricane resulted in 2,156 destroyed homes, 3,903 severely damaged houses, and 281 boats destroyed or left with major damage. Throughout the state, Donna caused over $300 million in damage (1960 USD, $2.19 billion 2008 USD) and 13 direct deaths.
- September 15, 1960– Tropical Storm Ethel struck Mississippi after rapidly weakening from a strong hurricane, and caused light winds and rainfall across western Florida. Damage totaled about $250,000 (1960 USD, $1.8 million 2008 USD), primarily from crop damage.
- September 23, 1960– Tropical Depression Florence struck near Chokoloskee, and after turning westward near Vero Beach emerged into the Gulf of Mexico before making a final landfall near Pensacola. The storm dropped moderate amounts of rainfall, causing localized but minor amounts of damage.
- September 11, 1961– Hurricane Carla struck Texas, with its outer rainbands dropping light amounts of precipitation across Florida.
- October 29, 1961 – The interaction between Hurricane Hattie and a ridge to its north produced squally winds of around 30 mph (50 km/h) across Florida.
- August 26, 1962– A tropical depression which later became Hurricane Alma brushed the southeastern portion of the state, dropping 3.6 inches (91 mm) of rain at Fort Drum.
- October, 1963– Rough surf from Hurricane Flora killed one in Miami.
- October 21, 1963– Hurricane Ginny passed about 50 miles (80 km) east of the state before turning northeastward, producing gusty winds, light rainfall, and minor damage.
- June 6, 1964– A tropical depression hit near Yankeetown and exited near Jacksonville. The depression produced thunderstorm activity and hail storms across the northern portion of the state, causing about $1 million in damage (1964 USD, $7 million 2008 USD).

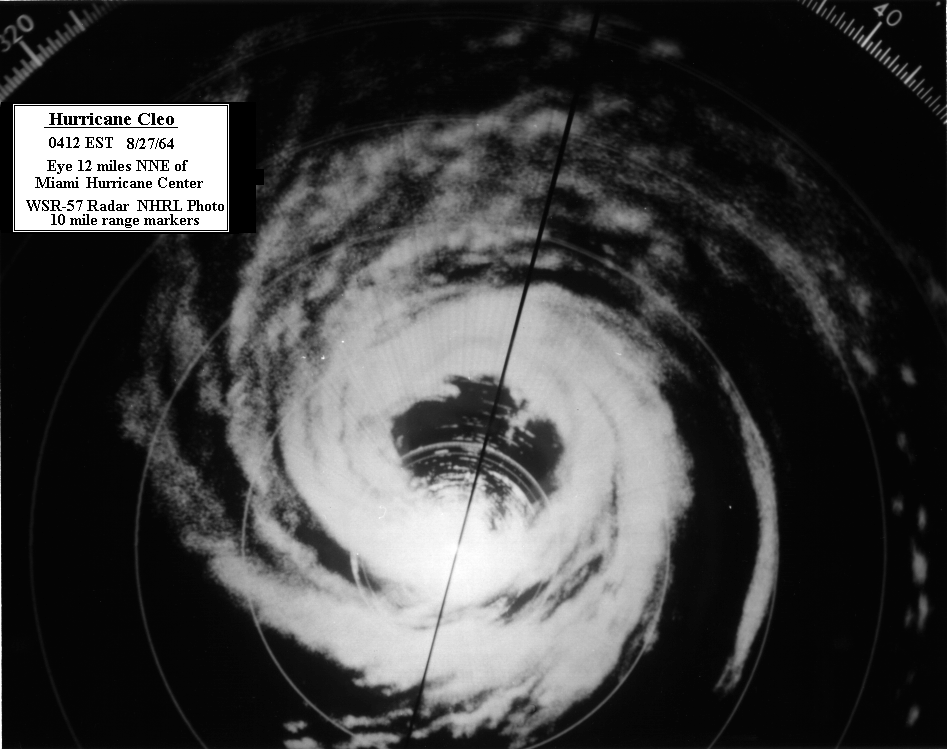
Radar image of Hurricane Cleo at landfall in Miami

- August 27, 1964– Hurricane Cleo struck near Miami with winds of about 105 mph (170 km/h), the first hurricane to hit the area in 14 years. Strong winds from the hurricane downed many trees and power lines, with moderate to heavy building and crop damage reported near the coast. Rainfall reached 6.8 inches (173 mm) in Miami, with storm tides peaking at 5.5 feet (1.7 m) in Pompano Beach. Damage in the state amounted to $125 million (1964 USD, $870 million 2008 USD); no deaths were reported in the state.
- September 10, 1964– Hurricane Dora made landfall as a weakening Category 2 hurricane near Jacksonville, the first hurricane in an extended period of time to strike the area. Dora produced moderate to heavy amounts of precipitation which peaked at 23.73 inches (603 mm) in Mayo, causing flooding damage and killing one from drowning. Wind gusts peaked at 125 mph (200 km/h) near St. Augustine, causing massive utility failures and heavy damage to buildings. Two Navy personnel died when their evacuating plane crashed upon takeoff. Damage totaled about $220 million (1964 USD, $1.53 billion 2008 USD).
- September 20, 1964– Hurricane Gladys produced rough surf along the eastern Florida coastline.
- October 5, 1964– The extratropical remnant of Hurricane Hilda entered the Florida Panhandle, dropping moderately heavy rainfall and producing high tides. One person drowned while surfing near Pensacola.
- October 14, 1964– Hurricane Isbell made landfall near Everglades City and dropped moderate amounts of precipitation peaking at 9.46 inches (240 mm) in West Palm Beach. The hurricane spawned at least 11 tornadoes and injured at least 50, mostly minor. Throughout the state, the hurricane killed three, of which one indirectly, and caused over $5 million (1964 USD, $35 million 2008 USD) in crop damage.
- June 15, 1965– An unnamed tropical storm hit near Panama City, producing high tides and moderate rainfall peaking at 5.99 inches (152 mm) in Tallahassee. Damage from the storm was minor, and no deaths or injuries were reported.

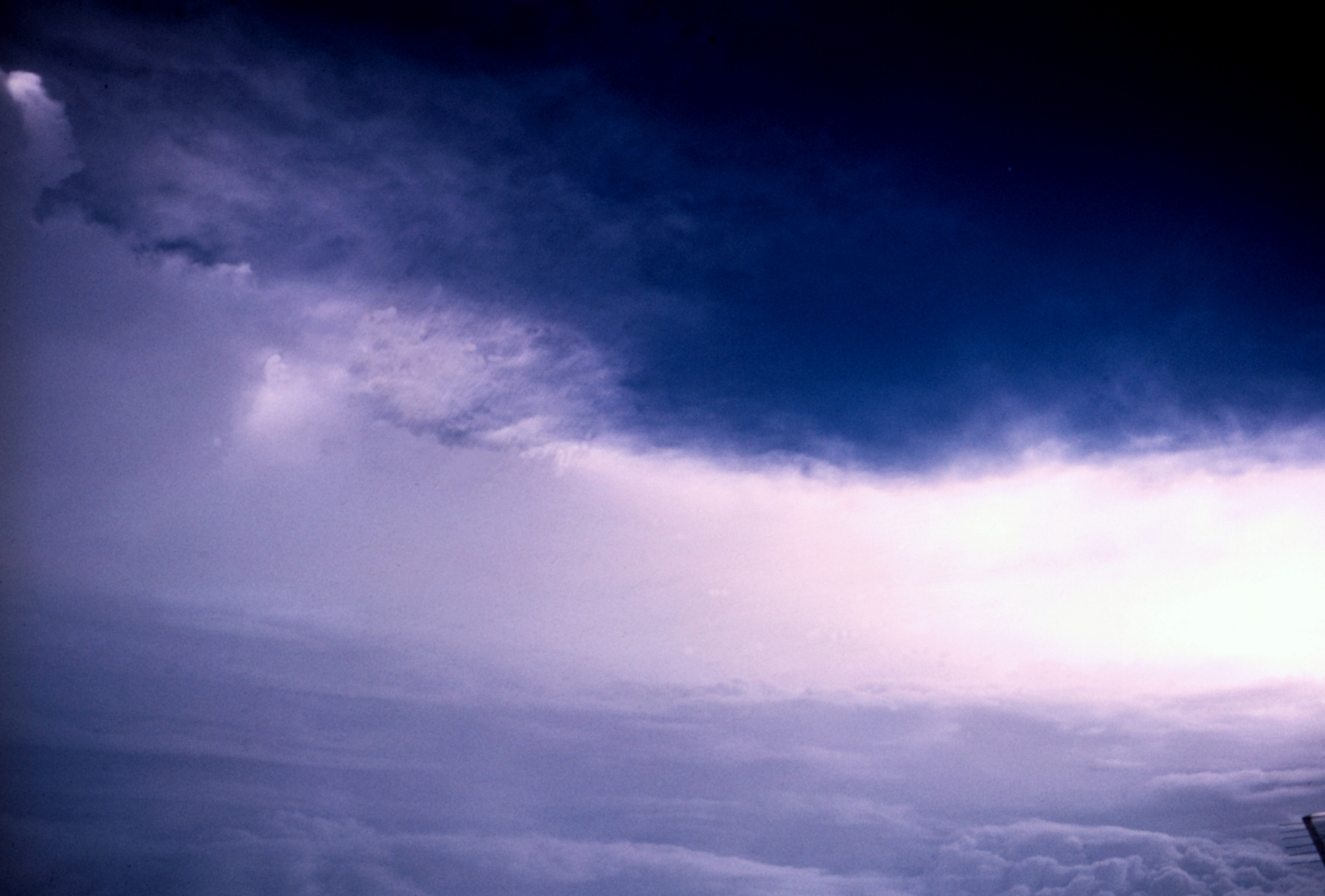
A view from the interior of Hurricane Betsy's eye, taken by Hurricane hunters before its Florida landfall

- September 8, 1965– Hurricane Betsy passed through the Florida Keys as a major hurricane, producing moderate rainfall reaching 11.8 inches (300 mm) at Plantation Key and wind gusts reaching an estimated peak of 160 mph (255 km/h) in North Key Largo. The rainfall provided relief to a water shortage in the Everglades, while strong waves and high tides caused considerable flooding in coastal and low-lying areas in the southeastern portion of the state. The passage of Betsy resulted in four deaths and $139.3 million in damage (1965 USD, $953 million 2008 USD) in the state. Betsy would enter the Gulf of Mexico and cause much greater devastation in southeastern Louisiana, where the storm caused 76 deaths and over $1 billion in damage.
- September 30, 1965– Tropical Storm Debbie dissipated off of the coast of Mississippi and dropped 3–5 inches (75–125 mm) of precipitation across the northern region of the state.
- June 9, 1966– Hurricane Alma made landfall near Apalachicola as a Category 2 hurricane after paralleling the western coastline as a major hurricane. Rainfall peaked at 7.7 inches (196 mm) in Miami, while tides reached 10 feet (3.0 m) above normal. The maximum sustained winds peaked at 125 mph (201 km/h) as it passed Key West. Alma caused $10 million in damage (1966 USD, $66 million 2008 USD), two direct deaths from drowning, and four indirect deaths.
- June 30, 1966– A tropical depression formed in the western Caribbean Sea and moved on a track similar to Alma. The center passed near Key Largo, producing two tornadoes, one of which destroyed two aircraft at Palm Beach International Airport, as well as moderate to heavy rainfall totaling nearly 10 inches (250 mm) at Everglades City and Jacksonville. The combination of Alma and this tropical depression brought 21.37 inches/542.8 mm to Miami, which established a new June rainfall record for that location.
- July 24, 1966– The precursor tropical low to a tropical depression crossed the northern portion of the state; its effects were minimal.
- October 4, 1966– Hurricane Inez passed through the Florida Keys, resulting in three deaths and $5 million in damage (1966 USD, $33 million 2008 USD). Rainfall in the state peaked at 4.8 inches (122 mm) at Kendall, while offshore the hurricane resulted in 45 casualties in the Florida Straits.
- June 4, 1968– Tropical Storm Abby moved ashore near Punta Gorda, spawning three small tornadoes and producing up to 14.2 inches (361 mm) of precipitation at Cocoa. The rainfall was beneficial and ended a severe, persistent drought in the state. The storm caused six indirect deaths in the state.
- June 18, 1968– The precursor tropical depression to Hurricane Brenda passed across the eastern portion of the state, dropping moderate precipitation peaking at 8.61 inches (219 mm) in Homestead. No damage was reported.
- July 5, 1968– A tropical depression struck the Florida Panhandle and quickly dissipated, though its impact is unknown.
- August 10, 1968– The precursor tropical depression to Hurricane Dolly moved through the eastern portion of the state, producing gusty winds though no known damage.
- August 28, 1968– A tropical depression stalled along the western coastline near Tampa before turning to the northeast and crossing the state. It dropped heavy rainfall, including 15 inches (381 mm) in Jacksonville, resulting in extensive localized flooding. The depression also spawned a tornado near Daytona Beach which destroyed a motel and several houses.

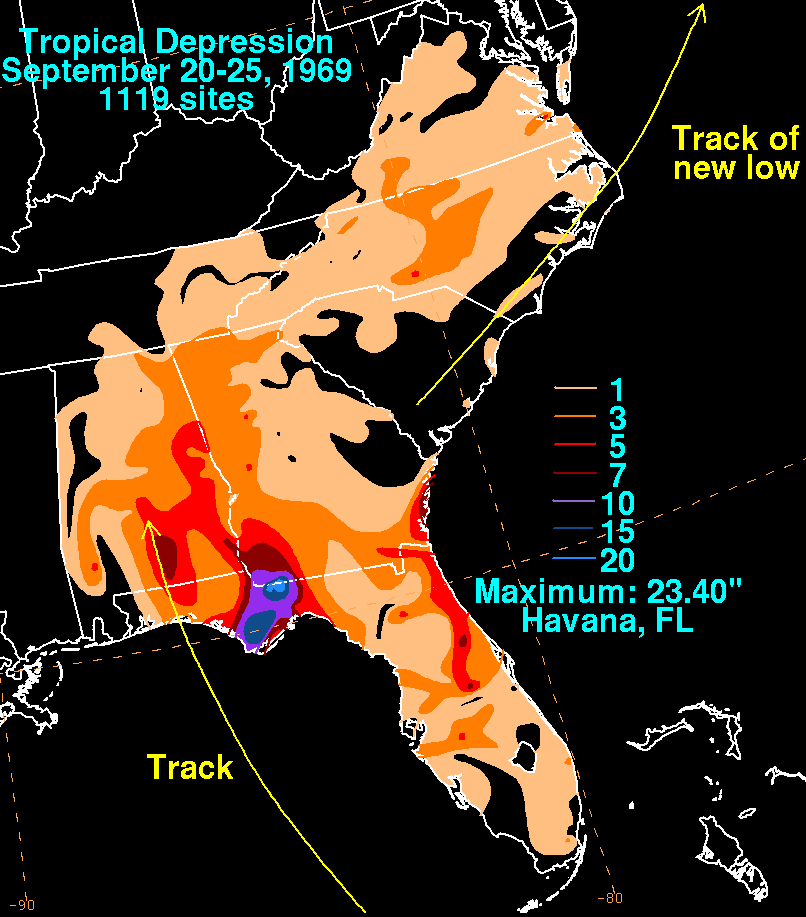
September 20–25, 1969 Tropical Depression Rainfall

- September 26, 1968– A tropical depression crossed the southern portion of the state, though its impact is unknown.
- October 19, 1968– Hurricane Gladys made landfall just north of Tampa Bay, producing moderate rainfall and two tornadoes while crossing the state. Damage totaled $6.7 million (1968 USD, $42 million 2008 USD), primarily due to structural damage.
- June 9, 1969– A tropical depression dissipated shortly after passing through the Florida Keys. Its effects are unknown.
- August 18, 1969– Hurricane Camille struck southern Mississippi as a Category 5 hurricane, with its large wind field producing a 71 mph (114 km/h) wind gust and 3.55 inches (90 mm) of rain in Pensacola. The hurricane caused minor crop damage to pecan trees and corn stalks.
- August 29, 1969– A tropical depression made landfall on the east-central portion of the state, though its impact is unknown.
- September 7, 1969– The precursor tropical depression to Hurricane Gerda passed over the southeastern portion of the state before turning to the northeast. Its rainfall impact was minimal, as less than three inches (76 mm) of rain fell across the Sunshine State.
- September 21, 1969– A tropical depression moved ashore along the western Florida Panhandle, before stalling. It became the wettest known tropical cyclone for the eastern Florida panhandle, when 23.40 inches (594 mm) fell at Havana.
- October 1, 1969– Subtropical Depression One hit the western Florida Panhandle. Its effects, if any, are unknown.
- October 2, 1969– Tropical Storm Jenny made landfall near Fort Myers, crossed the state, and approached the Atlantic Ocean near Cape Canaveral before turning to the west-southwest and exiting into the Gulf of Mexico near Tampa. The storm produced heavy rainfall of 5–8 inches (127–203 mm) across the central region of the state.
- October 21, 1969– Hurricane Laurie attained a peak strength of 105 mph (170 km/h) while moving eastward in the Gulf of Mexico. Its threat prompted officials to issue a gale warning from the Florida Keys to Fort Myers, though Laurie turned to the southwest and did not impact the state.

== 1970–1974 ==
=== 1970 ===
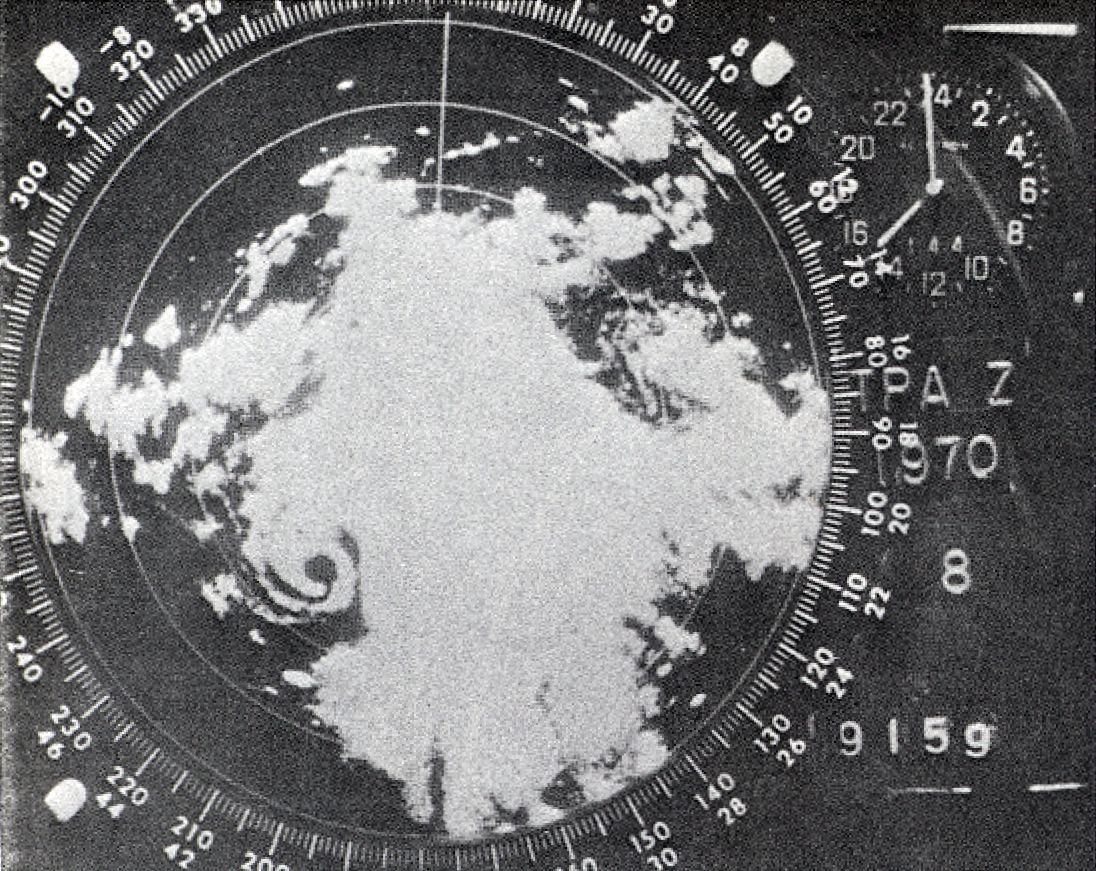
Remnants of Tropical Depression Alma

- May 25, 1970– Tropical Depression Alma made landfall near Yankeetown, producing moderate rainfall of 5–10 inches (127–254 mm) which ended a persistent drought in the southern portion of the state.
- July 22, 1970– Tropical Storm Becky hit Apalachicola, producing moderate rainfall peaking at over eight inches (203 mm) in Tallahassee which flooded 104 houses and injured two. The storm also spawned a tornado which destroyed a house and severely damaged three others in Panacea.
- August 6, 1970– A tropical depression moved ashore near Cape Canaveral, though its effects, if any, are unknown.
- September 13, 1970– The precursor tropical depression to Tropical Storm Felice passed through the Florida Keys, dropping beneficial rainfall to the southern portion of the state.
- September 27, 1970– Tropical Storm Greta passed through the Florida Keys as a weakening tropical cyclone, producing tropical storm force wind gusts but no reported damage.

=== 1971 ===
- August 10, 1971– A tropical depression which later became Hurricane Beth formed near Miami and subsequently tracked northeastward. Its effects in the state, if any, are unknown.
- August 13, 1971– A tropical depression struck Fort Myers, turned to the northwest into the Gulf of Mexico, intensified as it turned to the northeast, and moved ashore near Steinhatchee. The depression produced hurricane-force wind gusts at Cedar Key and dropped rainfall of over eight inches (203 mm), resulting in some coastal flooding.
- August 29, 1971– A tropical depression moved across the southern portion of the state, though its effects are unknown.
- September 1, 1971– The mid-level precursor disturbance to Hurricane Fern moved across the central portion of the state, dropping moderate precipitation which reached over five inches (127 mm) near Miami.
- September 16, 1971– Hurricane Edith hit southern Louisiana, producing light rainfall and a tornado near Pensacola.
- October 13, 1971– A tropical depression moved ashore near Apalachicola, though its effects are unknown.

=== 1972 ===
- May 28, 1972– Subtropical Storm Alpha made landfall near Brunswick, Georgia and turned southwestward across northern Florida, dropping light rainfall across its path but causing no damage.

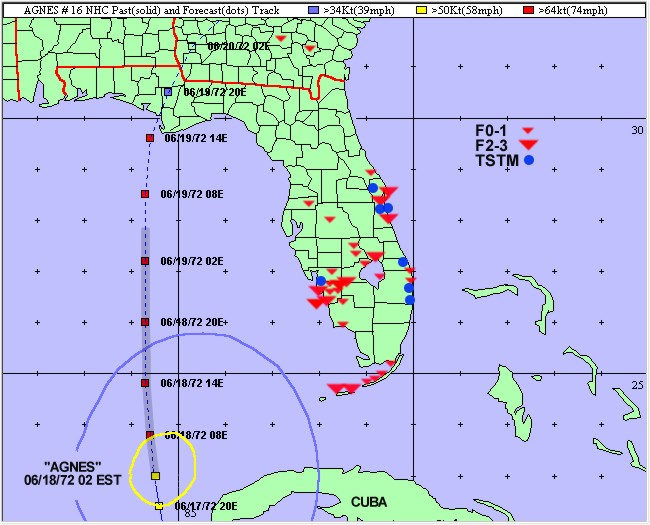
Plot of tornadoes by F-scale and severe thunderstorms of the Agnes outbreak

- June 19, 1972– Hurricane Agnes struck Panama City with minimal hurricane-force winds and a storm surge peaking at seven feet (2.1 m) in Cedar Key. Agnes produced moderate rainfall throughout the state, amounting to a maximum of 8.97 inches (228 mm) in Naples. The hurricane spawned 28 tornadoes in the state which destroyed 15 houses and 217 trailers. Throughout the state, Agnes caused $8.2 million in damage (1972 USD, $42 million 2008 USD) and nine deaths, seven of which were from the tornadoes.
- September 5, 1972– The tropical depression that later became Hurricane Dawn briefly passed over southeastern Florida before turning northeastward.

=== 1973 ===
- June 7, 1973– A tropical depression developed over the southeastern portion of the state, and briefly entered the Gulf of Mexico before hitting St. Marks. Its effects are unknown.
- June 23, 1973– An area of disturbed weather formed into a tropical depression over the northern portion of the state and subsequently tracked to the northeast.
- September 3, 1973– A tropical depression intensified into Tropical Storm Delia over the open Gulf of Mexico, producing light rain across Florida before striking Texas.
- September 25, 1973– Jacksonville was struck by a tropical depression, though its effects, if any, are unknown.

=== 1974 ===
- June 25, 1974– The combination of Subtropical Storm One, which struck Tampa, and a tropical depression to its southwest, produced slightly above normal tides and heavy rainfall reaching 20 inches (508 mm) near Tampa Bay. The passage of these systems caused three fatalities from drowning and $10 million in damage (1974 USD, $44 million 2008 USD) from tidal and rainfall flooding.
- September 8, 1974– Hurricane Carmen made landfall on southern Louisiana, with its outer rainbands producing precipitation across the state that reached over 10 inches (254 mm) in the extreme northwestern portion of the state.
- September 27, 1974– A tropical depression dissipated shortly after moving ashore near Cedar Key and caused no known effects.
- October 7, 1974– Subtropical Storm Four passed just offshore the eastern coastline and produced some beach erosion and localized flooding from rainfall peaking at 14 inches (356 mm) in Boca Raton.

== Monthly statistics ==
Number of recorded storms affecting Florida
Month	Number of storms
February	1
March	0
April	0
May	3
June	14
July	5
August	14
September	26
October	20
November	1

== Deadly storms ==
The following is a list of hurricanes with known deaths in the state.

Name	Year	Number of deaths
Inez	1966	48 (45 offshore)
Donna	1960	13
Agnes	1972	9
Unnamed	1957	5
Betsy	1965	4
King	1950	3
Unnamed	1974	3
Alma	1966	2 (4 indirect)
Isbell	1964	2 (1 indirect)
Unnamed	1956	2
Dora	1964	1 (2 indirect)
Flora	1963	1
Hilda	1964	1
Abby	1968	0 (6 indirect)
Flossy	1956	0 (4 indirect)
Debbie	1957	0 (4 indirect)
Easy	1950	0 (2 indirect)
Dora	1964	0 (2 indirect)
Brenda	1960	0 (few indirect)

== See also ==
- List of Atlantic hurricanes
