= Hurricane Cleo =

Category 4 Atlantic hurricane in 1964

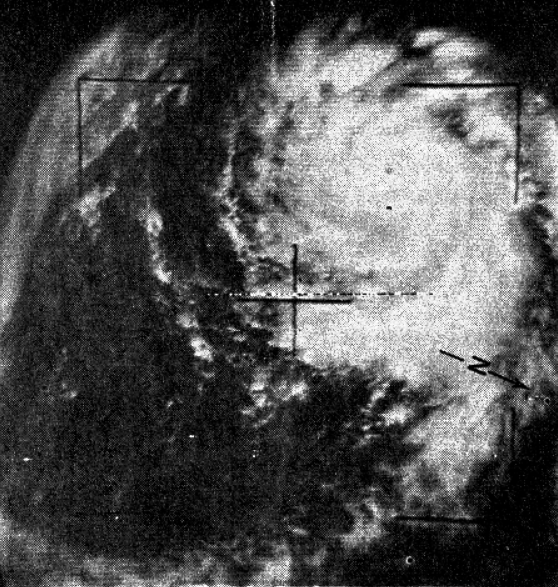
- Cleo as a Category 4 hurricane over the Caribbean on August 23

Meteorological history
- Formed: August 21, 1964
- Extratropical: September 4, 1964
- Dissipated: September 11, 1964

Category 4 major hurricane
- 1-minute sustained (SSHWS/NWS)
- Highest winds: 150 mph (240 km/h)
- Lowest pressure: 938 mbar (hPa); 27.70 inHg

Overall effects
- Fatalities: 156 total
- Damage: $187 million (1964 USD)
- Areas affected: Lesser Antilles, Greater Antilles (particularly Haiti), Southeast United States
- IBTrACS
- Part of the 1964 Atlantic hurricane season

Hurricane Cleo was the strongest tropical cyclone of the 1964 Atlantic hurricane season. It was the third named storm, first hurricane, and first major hurricane of the season. Cleo was one of the longest-lived storms of the season. This compact yet powerful hurricane travelled through the Caribbean Sea and later hit Florida before moving offshore Georgia into the Carolinas, killing 156 people and causing roughly $187 million in damage. Major damage was seen as far north as east-central Florida, with the heaviest rains falling along the immediate coast of the Southeast United States into southeast Virginia.

== Meteorological history ==
Map plotting the storm's track and intensity, according to the Saffir–Simpson scale Map key Saffir–Simpson scale Tropical depression (≤38 mph, ≤62 km/h) Tropical storm (39–73 mph, 63–118 km/h) Category 1 (74–95 mph, 119–153 km/h) Category 2 (96–110 mph, 154–177 km/h) Category 3 (111–129 mph, 178–208 km/h) Category 4 (130–156 mph, 209–251 km/h) Category 5 (≥157 mph, ≥252 km/h) Unknown Storm type Tropical cyclone Subtropical cyclone Extratropical cyclone, remnant low, tropical disturbance, or monsoon depression

A tropical wave that exited the coast of Africa on August 15, 1964, moved westward, not organizing into a tropical depression until around 890 miles (1,430 km) east of Barbados on August 20–as reported by a Navy reconnaissance plane. It continued west-northwestward, quickly strengthening to a hurricane the next day with a minimum central pressure of 993 mb. Early in the afternoon of August 22, Cleo crossed Guadeloupe as a 125 mph (201 km/h) Category 3 hurricane. The hurricane continued to strengthen as it moved through the Caribbean Sea and reached its peak intensity of 150 mph (240 km/h) on August 23 while south of the Dominican Republic. It maintained that intensity for 18 hours, bringing heavy rain and winds to Hispaniola. As Cleo passed south of Haiti on August 24, it veered northward momentarily, enough to move on to the Southwest Peninsula of Haiti. The circulation of the hurricane was greatly disrupted by the mountainous terrain of the island, quickly weakening the hurricane.

Cleo weakened to a Category 1 hurricane before hitting southern Cuba on August 26. It crossed the island quickly. Shortly after emerging from the north coast of Cuba, Cleo restrengthened to a hurricane, having weakened to a tropical storm while over Cuba. Cleo quickly intensified to a 110 mph (180 km/h) Category 2 hurricane before hitting the Miami, Florida area on August 27. It weakened to a tropical storm while over Florida later that day. The center moved offshore between Jacksonville and St. Augustine, Florida, before moving back onshore near Savannah, Georgia on August 29 without any increase in intensity. Its northward path along the Florida coast was unusual for the month of August.

Cleo continued to weaken as it moved through the Carolinas, drifting through as a tropical depression. After bringing heavy rain through the area, Cleo exited into the Atlantic Ocean near Norfolk, Virginia, and quickly intensified to a tropical storm again on September 1. The following day, Cleo became a hurricane again, but it remained well offshore and did not cause any further damage. Cleo was last noted on September 5 northeast of Newfoundland.

== Preparation ==
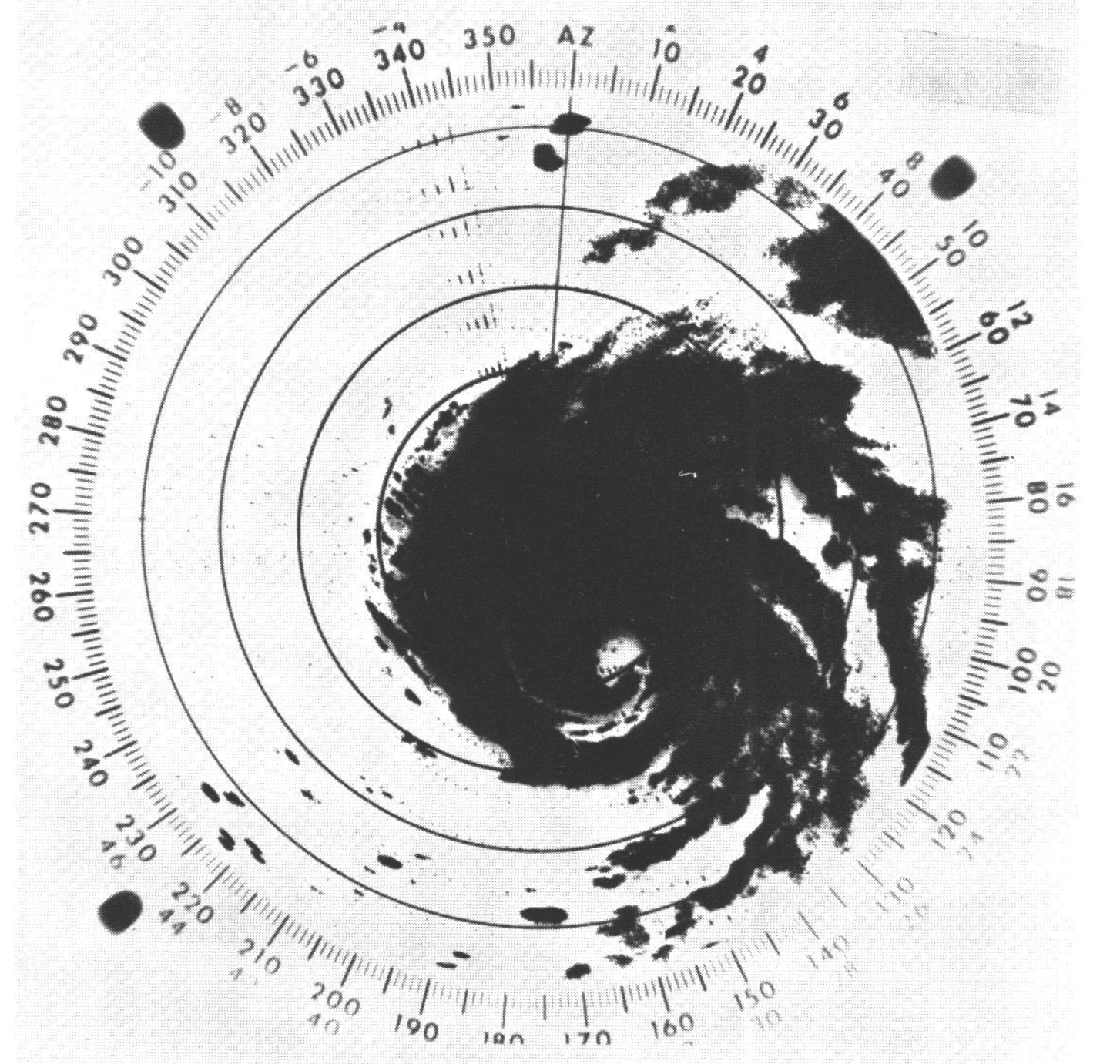
Radar image of Hurricane Cleo from Miami prior to landfall

Early on August 21 hurricane warnings were in effect for Barbados and the Windward Islands. On August 22 hurricane warnings were in effect for Puerto Rico and the Virgin Islands, with hurricane watches in effect for Haiti and the Dominican Republic. By August 23, hurricane watches remained in effect for Haiti and the Dominican Republic. Hurricane warnings were issued for Jamaica on August 24. By August 26 a hurricane watch had been raised from Key Largo, Florida to West Palm Beach, Florida. In advance of Cleo, the second stage of the Titan II/Gemini 2 launch vehicle was taken down and stored in a hangar on August 26 to protect it from the storm. Early on August 27, hurricane warnings extended northward to Cape Kennedy, Florida with gale warnings northward to Daytona Beach, Florida. Hurricane warnings were in effect northward to Brunswick, Georgia early on August 28 with a hurricane watch in effect between Brunswick, Georgia and Charleston, South Carolina. The hurricane watch for portions of the Georgia and South Carolina coasts continued into August 29.

== Impact ==
Summary of Cleo's impacts
Area	Deaths	Injuries	Damage
French West Indies	14	40	$50 million
Dominican Republic	7	—N/a	$2 million
Haiti	132	250	$5 million
Cuba	1	—N/a	$2 million
United States	2	17	$128 million
Totals	156	≥307	$187 million

=== Guadeloupe ===
Official reports from Guadeloupe indicated 14 dead, 40 injured, 1,000 homes destroyed and extensive damage to the island's infrastructure. The hurricane devastated sugar and banana plantations. One C-124 aircraft delivered seven tons of relief supplies to the island.

=== Greater Antilles ===
Moderate to heavy rains fell across Puerto Rico, peaking at 4.95 inches (126 mm) at Matrullas Dam. The outer bands of Cleo produced peak sustained winds of 52 mph (84 km/h) at Point Tuna, Puerto Rico. Offshore Puerto Rico on its initial penetration of Cleo on August 23, a Lockheed WC-121N Super Constellation used as a reconnaissance aircraft experienced its port wing tip fuel tank and portion of wing torn away by extreme updraft turbulence, which injured six of its crew. While trying to exit the storm, the starboard tip tank and larger portion of wing were torn away by extreme down draft turbulence. The aircraft was damaged beyond repair. Cleo led to the wettest known 24‑hour period recorded for any site within the Dominican Republic for any month, with 19.99 inches (508 mm) falling at Polo. Les Cayes, Haiti was leveled as the storm struck the town. The aircraft carrier U.S.S. Boxer arrived off the coast of Hispaniola on August 29 to provide medical aid and evacuation services to those in the worst impacted areas of Haiti and the Dominican Republic. Damage in Cuba was minimal because the hurricane had weakened and moved through quickly.

=== Florida ===
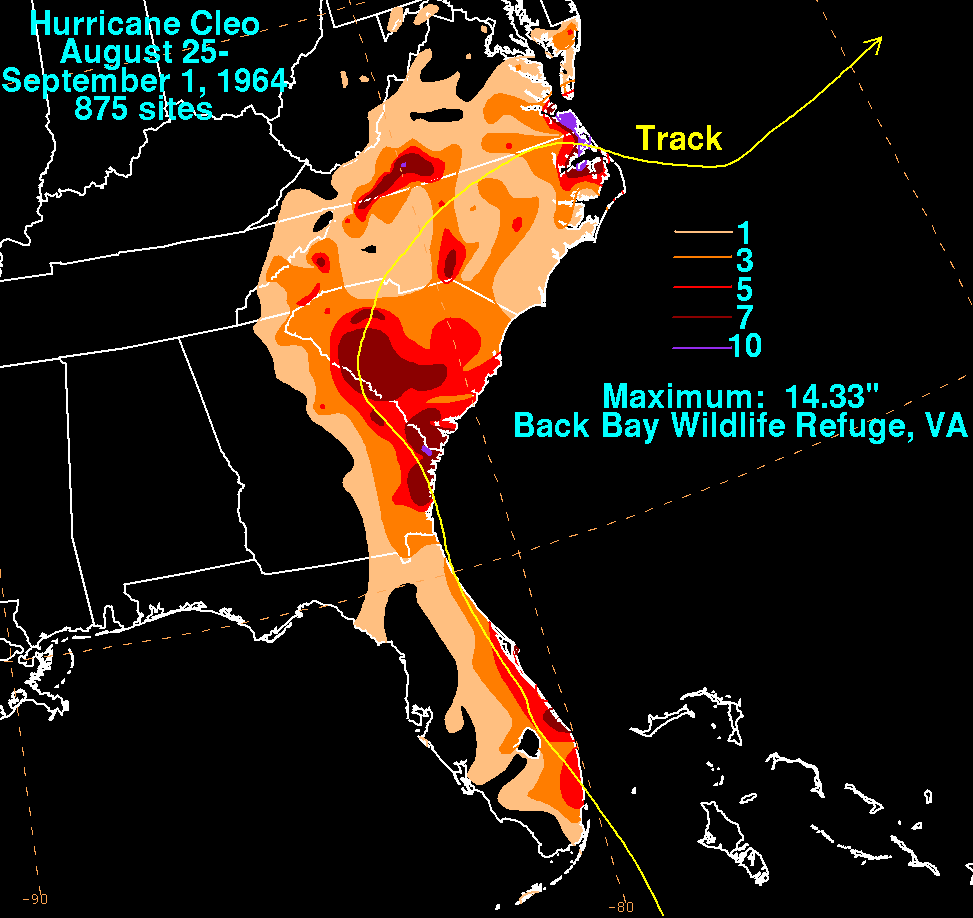
Cleo's rainfall in the United States

The hurricane was the first to directly strike Miami since Hurricane King in the 1950 season. Cleo intensified rapidly just prior to landfall, bringing sustained winds of 100–105 mph (161–169 km/h) with gusts to 135 mph (217 km/h) to the Miami area, due to moving over water temperatures of 30 to 32 degrees Celsius and its compact size. Lightning was observed within the eyewall at the National Hurricane Center. The pressure fell to 967.6 mb (28.57 inches) in North Miami. Major damage was constrained to a 20–35 miles (32–56 km) wide strip from Miami to Melbourne, in the form of broken glass, interior flooding, uprooted trees, overturned aircraft, power failures, and agriculture. Cleo cut power to 620,000 homes and businesses in southeast Florida. In Miami Shores the electricity was out for five days. At least two dozen fires blazed across Miami. About a quarter of the grapefruit crop was lost within the Indian River citrus producing region. The storm surge reached 4–6 feet (1.2–1.8 m) between Miami and Pompano Beach. The highest rainfall total measured within Florida was 9.37 inches (238 mm) at Stuart.

The Sebastian River Baptist Church had its roof torn off during the cyclone. Minor damage occurred north of Melbourne. Heavy rains fell along the east coast of the state, along and east of its track. Three tornadoes were reported with the storm within the state borders.

Cleo caused the Fort Lauderdale News, one of South Florida's biggest newspapers, to miss publishing, the only time that happened in its history. Storyland, a popular children's theme park in Pompano Beach, was destroyed and never rebuilt. A disaster declaration for Florida was made on September 8. Florida Atlantic University's grand opening to students was delayed six days due to Cleo.

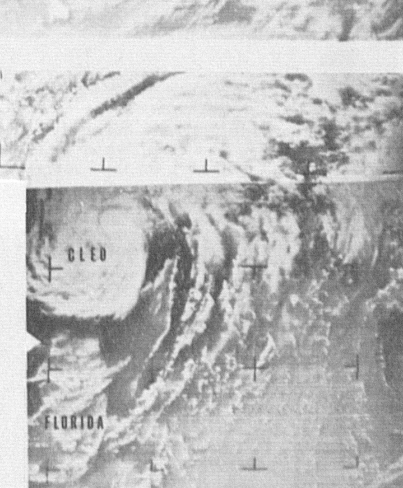
Satellite image of Cleo over the Southeast U.S on August 29

=== Southeast United States ===
Heavy rains spread up along the Georgia coast into the Carolinas and southern Virginia in association with the weakening tropical storm. Interaction with a frontal boundary to its north led to significant rains across extreme southeast Virginia to the left of its track exceeding 14 inches (360 mm) in the Norfolk metropolitan area. This helped lead to double the average rainfall for the month of September for southeast Virginia. Seven tornadoes were reported within South Carolina, while North Carolina witnessed three tornado touchdowns.

=== Retirement ===
The name Cleo was later retired by the Weather Bureau. It was replaced with Candy for the 1968 season.

== Aftermath ==
After surviving Cleo's wrath in the Bahamas, a survivor came up with the idea of a floating hospital designed to help out areas after a catastrophe. A husband-wife pair who survived Cleo bought a retired luxury liner for such a purpose 14 years later, and it was put into service in 1982. Virginia Beach, Virginia fought to build a drainage canal to help drain the Lynnhaven flood zone after Cleo's flooding rains struck the region. Over the objection of those in North Carolina, the canal was built. The result of the creation of this canal was an increase in salinity of nearly fivefold from pre-canal levels, which decimated aquatic vegetation in Currituck Sound by 1998. As a result, black bass disappeared from Currituck Sound.

== See also ==
- Hurricane King (1950)
- Hurricane Matthew
- List of Florida hurricanes (1950–1974)
- List of Cuba hurricanes
- List of highest known 24-hour tropical cyclone rainfall amounts for the Dominican Republic
