= Hurricane Dog (1950) =

Category 4 Atlantic hurricane

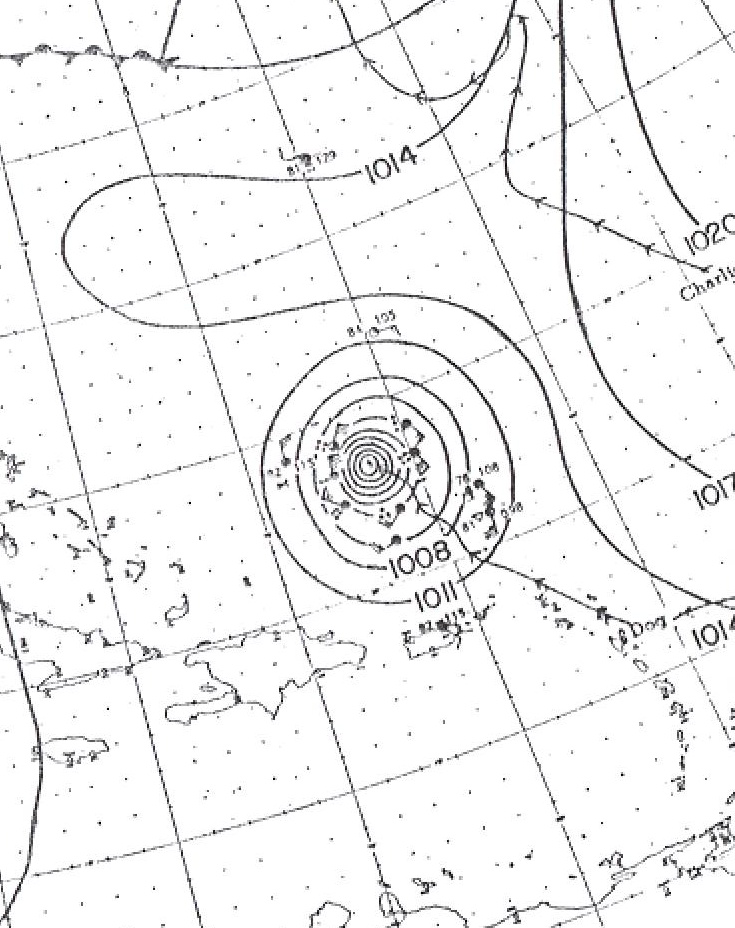
- Surface weather analysis of Hurricane Dog on September 4

Meteorological history
- Formed: August 30, 1950
- Extratropical: September 11, 1950
- Dissipated: September 18, 1950

Category 4 major hurricane
- 1-minute sustained (SSHWS/NWS)
- Highest winds: 145 mph (230 km/h)
- Lowest pressure: ≤943 mbar (hPa); ≤27.85 inHg

Overall effects
- Fatalities: 31
- Damage: $3 million (1950 USD)
- Areas affected: Lesser Antilles, Puerto Rico, East Coast of the United States, Bermuda, Atlantic Canada, Northern Ireland, Scotland
- IBTrACS
- Part of the 1950 Atlantic hurricane season

Hurricane Dog was the most intense hurricane in the 1950 Atlantic hurricane season. Prior to reanalysis by the Hurricane Research Division in 2014, it was considered one of the strongest Atlantic hurricanes on record, equivalent to Category 5 status on the modern Saffir-Simpson scale, with winds of 185 miles per hour (298 km/h). The fourth named storm of the season, Dog developed on August 30 to the east of Antigua; after passing through the northern Lesser Antilles, it turned to the north and intensified into a Category 4 hurricane. Dog reached its peak intensity with winds of 145 mph (230 km/h) over the open Atlantic, and after weakening it passed within 200 miles (320 km) of Cape Cod, Massachusetts. The storm became extratropical on September 12.

Hurricane Dog caused extensive damage to the Leeward Islands, and was considered the most severe hurricane on record in Antigua. Many buildings were destroyed or severely damaged on the island, with thousands left homeless just weeks after Hurricane Baker caused serious damage there. In the United States, the hurricane caused moderate coastal damage, including damage to several boats, and resulted in 11 offshore drownings. Strong winds caused widespread power outages across southeastern New England. Twelve people were missing and assumed dead offshore Nova Scotia. Damage across its path totaled about $3 million (1950 USD). (Note: All currency totals are in United States dollars and are unadjusted for inflation.)

== Meteorological history ==
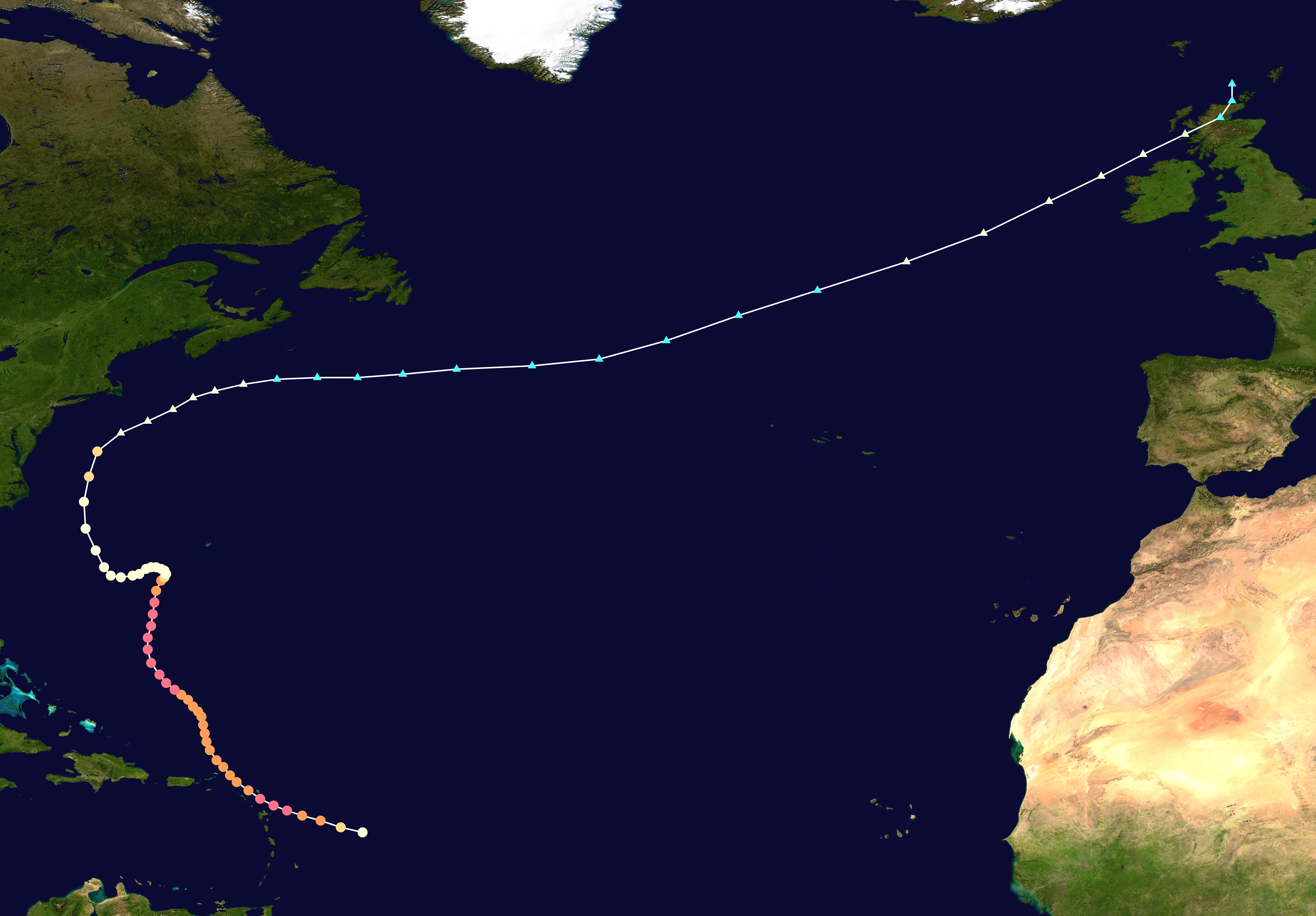
Map plotting the storm's track and intensity, according to the Saffir–Simpson scale Map key Saffir–Simpson scale Tropical depression (≤38 mph, ≤62 km/h) Tropical storm (39–73 mph, 63–118 km/h) Category 1 (74–95 mph, 119–153 km/h) Category 2 (96–110 mph, 154–177 km/h) Category 3 (111–129 mph, 178–208 km/h) Category 4 (130–156 mph, 209–251 km/h) Category 5 (≥157 mph, ≥252 km/h) Unknown Storm type Tropical cyclone Subtropical cyclone Extratropical cyclone, remnant low, tropical disturbance, or monsoon depression

The exact origins of Hurricane Dog are obscure, due to sparse ship and land observations over the eastern Atlantic Ocean; the storm may have originated from an easterly wave on August 24 near the Cape Verde islands, but there are no observations to support such development. Ships first encountered the storm on August 30, when the SS Sibrodin reported gale-force winds and an area of low pressure about 320 miles (510 km) east-southeast of Antigua. The storm is first documented as a hurricane with winds of 90 mph (145 km/h) late on August 30. With high pressures to its northeast, the storm tracked west-northwestward and rapidly intensified: on August 31 it attained major hurricane status, reaching winds of 130 mph (209 km/h)—the first peak intensity in its life—before entering the Leeward Islands. Early on September 1, Hurricane Dog passed just north of Antigua as the equivalent of a Category 4 hurricane on the Saffir-Simpson hurricane wind scale. A weather station on Antigua reported a pressure of 28.73 inches of mercury (973 mb), though the eye of the hurricane missed the station. After bypassing Antigua, Hurricane Dog weakened slightly, based on reports by reconnaissance aircraft; the cyclone made its first and only landfall over Anguilla with winds of 120 to 125 mph (193 to 201 km/h). The cyclone produced hurricane-force winds over Antigua and the nearby island of Saint Martin, which reported a pressure of 978.7 mb (28.90 inHg).

Early on September 2, Hurricane Dog came under weak steering currents, causing it to drift northward. The cyclone weakened even further: aircraft recorded a central pressure of 962 mb (28.4 inHg), and maximum sustained winds diminished to 115 mph (185 km/h). The storm mostly maintained its intensity for two more days, but on September 4 it began to re-intensify as it turned northwestward. On September 5, Hurricane Dog regained Category 4 intensity about 335 miles (540 km) north of the eastern tip of the Dominican Republic. The hurricane strengthened further after turning to the north, and Hurricane Dog reached its second and strongest peak intensity of 145 mph (233 km/h). On September 6, Hurricane Hunters visually estimated peak winds of 185 mph (300 km/h) about 450 miles (720 km) south-southwest of Bermuda; however, being early in the period of hurricane reconnaissance, such wind speeds—derived from observations of the sea surface—were subjective and sometimes unreliable. In 2014, a reanalysis of HURDAT by the Hurricane Research Division found that the peak winds in Hurricane Dog were more likely 145 mph (230 km/h), marking a reduction in the intensity of Hurricane Dog from Category 5 to Category 4. Nevertheless, while now estimated to have been less intense than assessed operationally in 1950, Dog was a formidable hurricane while over the western Atlantic, producing wave heights of over 100 feet (30 m).

Hurricane Dog maintained its peak intensity for about 12 hours. On September 7, the cyclone attained a central pressure of 948 mbar (27.99 inHg), which was the lowest pressure in association with the hurricane. A building ridge of high pressure to its north caused it to decelerate and weaken steadily for unknown reasons as it turned to the west; by September 9, the intensity had decreased to 75 mph (121 km/h). On September 10, Hurricane Dog began turning to the northwest, and a day later it headed north and then northeast. Late that day, it briefly re-intensified slightly to 100 mph (161 km/h) before transitioning into an extratropical cyclone with hurricane-force winds. The former hurricane passed within 200 miles (320 km) of Cape Cod on September 12. Shortly afterwards, the extratropical remnant turned to the east, losing hurricane winds for several days beginning on September 13. The system eventually turned to the northeast on September 15, and a day later it regained hurricane-force winds as a vigorous extratropical cyclone. Early on September 17, the cyclone struck Scotland with winds of 75 mph (121 km/h), but the system persisted until finally losing its identity north of Scotland on September 18.

== Preparations ==
In the United States, the threat of the hurricane prompted the National Weather Bureau to issue warnings of gale-force winds, high tides, and rough surf from the Outer Banks of North Carolina to Maine. At least 17 naval ships were moved in preparation for the hurricane. Rhode Island state police officers warned homeowners near the coast to be ready to evacuate, if necessary. There, officials also closed several beaches and canceled ferry travel along the state's southern waterways. On the day of the hurricane's closest approach to the United States, the National Weather Bureau issued storm warnings from Cape May, New Jersey, to Eastport, Maine.

== Impact and aftermath ==
Passing through the Lesser Antilles, Hurricane Dog produced a storm surge of 8 feet (2.4 m) in Antigua. Winds on Antigua and Barbuda were estimated at 130 mph (210 km/h), with a gust of 144 mph (232 km/h) recorded at St. John's, Antigua and Barbuda. On Antigua, where hurricane-force winds were reported for six hours, residents considered it the most severe hurricane in history. Hurricane Dog left thousands homeless on Antigua, just weeks after Hurricane Baker caused severe damage on the island. Damage throughout the Lesser Antilles totaled $1 million, primarily on Antigua and Barbuda, and included many damaged or destroyed homes, ruined crops, blocked roads from washouts or fallen trees, and power outages across the islands. The hurricane resulted in several shipwrecks; two people drowned when their small boat capsized. The hurricane sank a boat on the island of Saint-Barthélemy, where damage amounted to $70,000. A relief fund was organized in the aftermath of the hurricane by The Daily Gleaner, a newspaper from Kingston, Jamaica. The newspaper invited its readers to help assist "their suffering fellow-West Indians in the island of Antigua." Four days after the hurricane, the fund totaled £171,000 (1950 GBP). One Antigua official stated the country "would appreciate voluntary assistance from outside, especially food and clothing". Relief aid was also sent from the United States to the affected islands.

Heavy rain fell in the Mid-Atlantic States, leading to flash floods in some locations. In Bel Air, Maryland, a car drove into the swollen Little Gunpowder Falls; three people in the car drowned and a fourth was injured. A further two people drowned in Lexington, Virginia. Though newspaper sources attributed the heavy rainfall to Hurricane Dog, this was not confirmed. The hurricane deposited light to moderate rainfall across southeastern Massachusetts, ranging from around 1 inch (25 mm) to about 4 to 5 inches (100 to 125 mm) near Nantucket. In Provincetown, a car hit a woman—neither the driver nor the victim was able to see due to the rains. A man in Falmouth was paralyzed from the waist downwards after coming into contact with a wet tree limb next to a downed power line.

The hurricane produced high tides and rough surf along the East Coast of the United States, with coastal flooding reported along some beaches in Rhode Island. The hurricane capsized or damaged several boats along the coastline, including two large vessels in Nantucket. In Marblehead, Massachusetts, the surf grounded at least 15 vessels from the harbor onto a coastal causeway. Near Cape Cod, damage to fishermen's assets totaled $150,000. Tides along Nantucket were reported at the highest levels since the 1944 Great Atlantic Hurricane. Hurricane Dog produced powerful wind gusts along coastal areas of New England, which caused widespread power outages, including a loss of power to 15 towns on Cape Cod, to hundreds of residences on Nantucket, and to several other locations in the area. Additionally, winds from the hurricane destroyed two small barns and uprooted a few trees, some of which blocked roads. Overall damage was fairly light, totaling about $2 million. In all, 12 people died in New England as a result of the hurricane. Two ships went missing during the storm along the coast of Nova Scotia, with a crew of six people each; their status is unknown, and they are considered storm fatalities.

== See also ==
- List of Atlantic hurricanes
