= List of storms named Easy =

The name Easy was given to three tropical cyclones in the Atlantic Ocean.

- Hurricane Easy (1950) – made landfall in Florida as a Category 3 hurricane; caused heavy damage in Cedar Key and produced heavy rainfall
- Hurricane Easy (1951) – Category 4 hurricane that never threatened land.
- Hurricane Easy (1952) – Category 2 hurricane that never threatened land.
