= Hurricane King =

Category 4 Atlantic hurricane in 1950

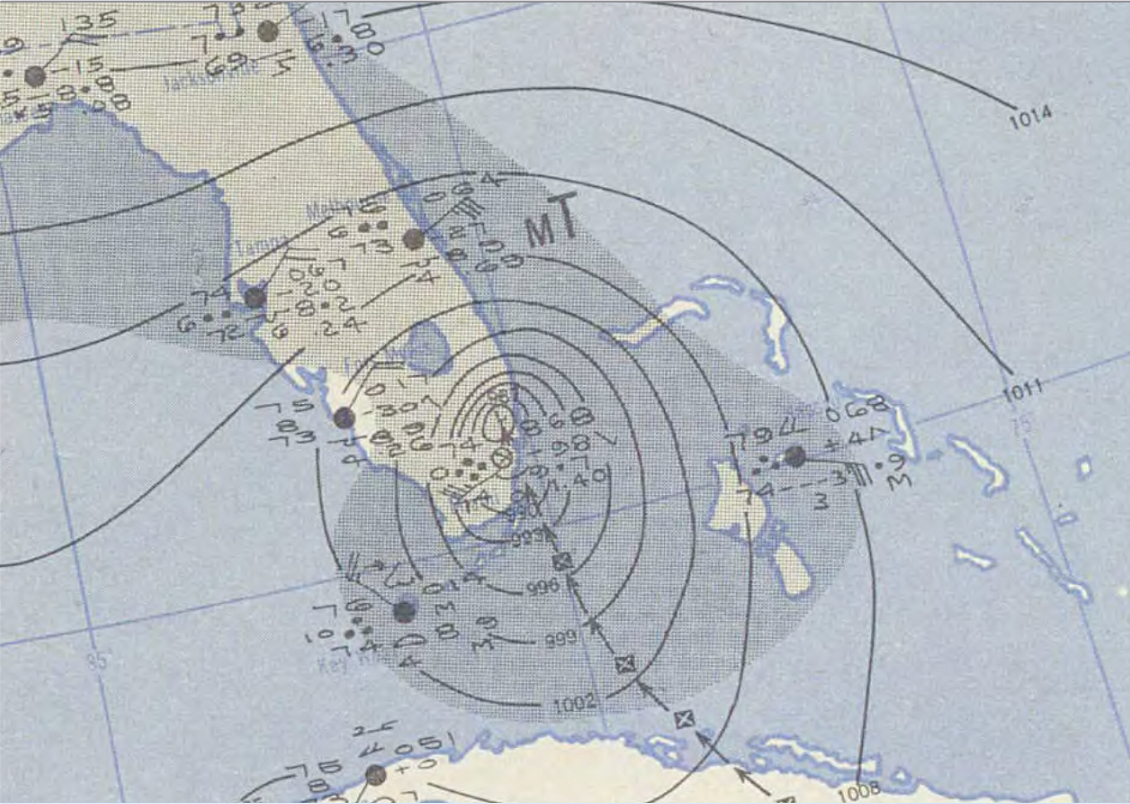
- Surface weather map showing Hurricane King making landfall in Southern Florida on October 18

Meteorological history
- Formed: October 13, 1950
- Dissipated: October 20, 1950

Category 4 major hurricane
- 1-minute sustained (SSHWS/NWS)
- Highest winds: 130 mph (215 km/h)
- Lowest pressure: 955 mbar (hPa); 28.20 inHg

Overall effects
- Fatalities: 11 direct
- Damage: $32 million (1950 USD)
- Areas affected: Cuba, Florida, Georgia
- IBTrACS
- Part of the 1950 Atlantic hurricane season

Hurricane King was the most severe hurricane to strike the city of Miami, Florida, since the 1926 Miami hurricane. It was the eleventh tropical storm and the last of six major hurricanes in the 1950 Atlantic hurricane season. The cyclone formed in the western Caribbean Sea on October 13, and initially moved northeastward, slowly strengthening. Hurricane King crossed Cuba on October 17, causing seven deaths and $2 million in damage (1950 USD). It reached its peak intensity of 130 mph (215 km/h) and subsequently made landfall on downtown Miami. The hurricane damaged 20,861 houses in southern Florida, 580 of them severely, and destroyed a further 248. Further inland, King caused heavy crop damage, particularly to the citrus industry. After weakening to a tropical storm, King moved across Georgia, where it caused isolated power outages and minor damage. Across the United States, the hurricane left four fatalities and $30 million in damage ($316 million in 2014 USD).

== Meteorological history ==
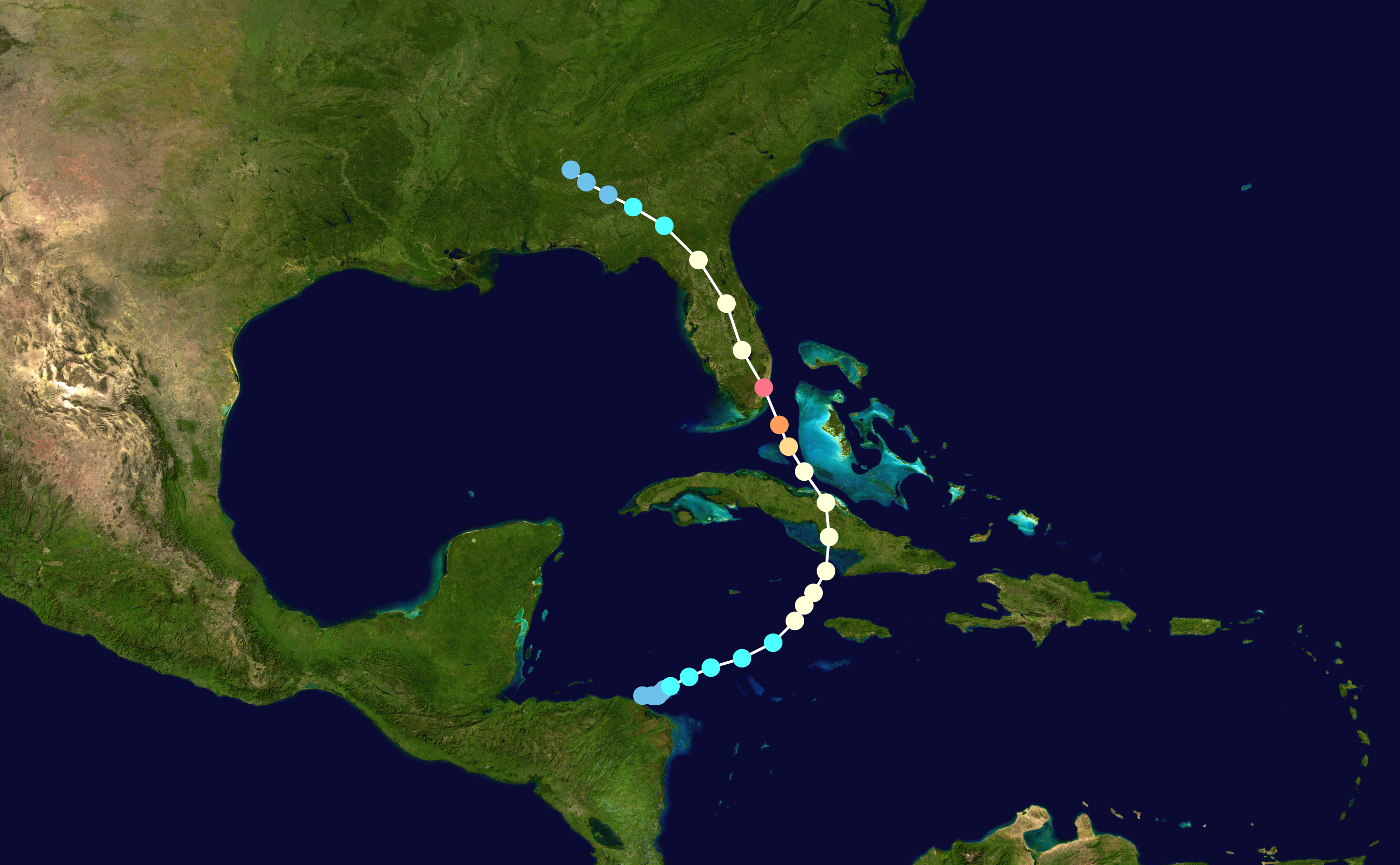
Map plotting the storm's track and intensity, according to the Saffir–Simpson scale Map key Saffir–Simpson scale Tropical depression (≤38 mph, ≤62 km/h) Tropical storm (39–73 mph, 63–118 km/h) Category 1 (74–95 mph, 119–153 km/h) Category 2 (96–110 mph, 154–177 km/h) Category 3 (111–129 mph, 178–208 km/h) Category 4 (130–156 mph, 209–251 km/h) Category 5 (≥157 mph, ≥252 km/h) Unknown Storm type Tropical cyclone Subtropical cyclone Extratropical cyclone, remnant low, tropical disturbance, or monsoon depression

The origins of Hurricane King were from a tropical depression that developed just off the north coast of Honduras on October 13. It was a small system throughout its duration, and initially moved toward the east and east-northeast. At the time, the system was considered a weak and broad depression, producing convection, or thunderstorms, from Honduras to western Cuba. It tracked to the east-northeast, becoming a tropical storm on October 14. The system was later given the name "King" from the Joint Army/Navy Phonetic Alphabet.

The tropical storm slowly intensified as it tracked toward Cuba, and on October 16, King attained hurricane status while passing between Jamaica and the Cayman Islands. It quickly intensified that day, and at 22:00 UTC, the hurricane made landfall just west of Camagüey with winds of 90 mph (150 km/h). The hurricane remained small, as the city of Camagüey reported peak winds of only 65 mph (105 km/h). Within twelve hours, Hurricane King crossed central Cuba, during which it weakened into a minimal hurricane. After entering the Florida Straits, King quickly re-intensified, and Hurricane Hunters indicated maximum winds of 100 to 105 mph (161 to 169 km/h) over water. At the time, the barometric pressure was 988 mb (29.2 inHg), and the eye was 20 miles (32 km) in diameter. The hurricane quickly intensified as it turned north-northwestward. Early on October 18, King attained major hurricane status; it was the sixth and final major hurricane of the season. In 24 hours, the pressure dropped 33.2 mb (0.98 inHg) and the eye contracted to just 5 miles (8.0 km) in diameter. At 05:00 UTC on October 18, Hurricane King made landfall near Grove Isle, Coconut Grove, a short distance west of downtown Miami, with peak winds of 130 mph (215 km/h), making it a Category 4 hurricane—the fifth in South Florida since 1945. A private barometer in Miami measured the storm's central pressure, 28.20 inHg (955 mb). The Miami Weather Bureau office, which was struck by the eastern eyewall, recorded sustained winds of 122 mph (196 km/h) with gusts estimated at 150 mph (240 km/h).

Over land, the compact hurricane—its eye attended by a half-hour-long lull in the Miami area—weakened as it continued through the state, though its eye was still well defined over Broward County, as celestial bodies such as stars and the Moon were seen during its passage. At the time of its closest approach to Fort Lauderdale, King was still a major hurricane, the most recent on record to affect the city. After crossing Lake Okeechobee, Hurricane King passed near the city of Okeechobee, which recorded a minimum barometric pressure of 28.85 inHg (977 mb). The winds diminished along the southern and western side of the storm, although winds gusted to hurricane force in many locations in eastern coastal Florida. Early on October 19, King weakened to tropical storm status over north-central Florida, and later that day weakened further into a tropical depression over western Georgia. King curved northwestward, dissipating over Alabama on October 20.

== Preparations and impact ==
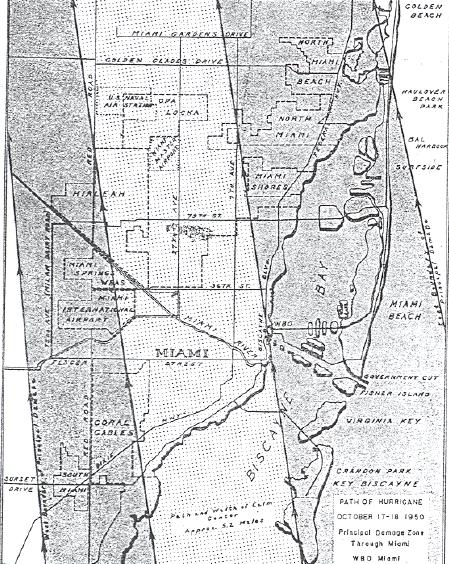
Wind swath of King over Miami

=== Caribbean ===
Early in its duration, King produced a widespread area of convection that spread from Honduras to Cuba. Swan Island, located just off of the coast of Honduras, reported 2.03 in (52 mm) of rainfall, while Jamaica registered 25 in (640 mm) in 48 hours; the torrential downpour extensively damaged infrastructure on the latter island. Prior to its first landfall, officials posted hurricane warnings across eastern Cuba and the Bahamas. While crossing over Cuba, Hurricane King produced winds of up to 120 mph (190 km/h). The hurricane killed seven people and caused $2 million (1950 USD) in damage throughout the country. Offshore, a freighter sunk during the storm, prompting the crew's rescue by the Cuban navy. There was an initial report of ten people missing on the ship, although it is unknown how many, if any, were related to the seven confirmed deaths in the country.

=== Florida ===
About 36 hours prior to the hurricane making landfall, when it was still south of Cuba, the Miami Weather Bureau issued a hurricane alert for South Florida. About 18 hours before landfall, the alert was replaced by a hurricane warning. The advance warning time was believed to have prevented many deaths; however, the population was considered complacent with the warning, causing additional damage when they executed improper preparations, such as securing windows. Due to its compactness, the storm initially confounded attempts to gauge its intensity, and so forecasters were taken aback by reports of its strength from the Miami area.

Hurricane King struck Miami around midnight local time with a very compact area of strong winds. Its eye was about 5.2 miles (8.4 km) in diameter; the western edge of the eye moved across Miami International Airport, which reported wind gusts of 125 mph (201 km/h), and the eastern side struck the Miami Weather Bureau office, which recorded sustained winds of 122 mph (196 km/h). The principal damage zone was sharply defined in an area 14 miles (23 km) in diameter; the boundaries of the damage resembled the path of a tornado, although a subsequent analysis indicated the majority of the damage was not tornadic in nature. There was one confirmed report of a damaging tornado in Davie. As it made landfall, Hurricane King produced lightning near its center, which was the first confirmed occurrence in Florida; thunder was also heard at the time. The Weather Bureau considered King the severest hurricane to hit Miami in more than 24 years.

Across Florida, damage totaled $27.75 million (1950 USD), of which $15 million was in the Miami metropolitan area. The hurricane damaged 20,861 houses in southern Florida, 580 of them severely. Additionally, 248 trailer homes were damaged, 188 of them severely. A total of 248 houses or trailers were destroyed in the Miami area. A preliminary survey indicated there were about 2,000 store windows that were broken during the storm. In Broward County aluminum jalousies were bent and shorn of paint, a home was stripped of half its roof tiles, and all but one fruit tree were downed on a property. Intense winds felled about a dozen radio towers in the Miami metropolitan area, flipped six airplanes at Miami International Airport, and tore the roofs off several hundred structures. Most homes in the worst-hit areas lost all or most of their roofing, damage to structures was significant, and many palm trees were splintered. Up to 2 ft (0.61 m) of water inundated sections of Miami Beach and left behind deep layers of sand in the rooms and lobbies of dozens of hotels. Strong winds nearby flipped automobiles as well, and businesses and homes on South Beach were wrecked. In West Hollywood, a town of 2,000 people located north of Miami, strong winds destroyed or severely damaged about 150 houses, leaving hundreds homeless. At the Broward County airport in Fort Lauderdale, the winds damaged 55 buildings and destroyed one plane. Further north, damage was lighter in Palm Beach, consisting of downed trees and flooded streets. Along its path through the state, strong winds were observed around Lake Okeechobee, with 93-mile-per-hour (150 km/h) gusts in Clewiston. In Orlando, the winds destroyed the roof of an airport hangar.

Wind reports in Florida * indicates a wind gust^ indicates winds are estimated
Location	Peak	
Location	mph	km/h
Carysfort Reef Light	66	107
Miami Weather Bureau	122; 150*^	197; 242
Miami International Airport	125*	202
Hillsboro Inlet Light	91	147
Clewiston	93*	150
Vero Beach	72	116
Jacksonville	82*^	133

In central Florida, the hurricane caused widespread damage to crops and properties. Damage to the grapefruit crop was heaviest in the region along the Indian River, where losses were expected to reach 30%. The orange crop was not as affected, and no area reported total losses at more than 5%. Losses to the citrus crop were considered better than initially anticipated. Overall, the citrus crop damage totaled about $3 million, with 2.5 million boxes destroyed. Additionally, the hurricane flooded about 20.3 sq mi (53 km^{2}) of vegetable fields around Lake Okeechobee. Near Pompano, high winds and rain caused heavy losses to crops planted during early autumn, including snap beans, lima beans, cucumbers, eggplant, pepper, and squash; most of the crops required replanting. Elsewhere, the snap bean and sweet corn crops were severely damaged around the Everglades, and farms around Fort Pierce experienced heavy losses to the tomato crop.

Intense rainbands spread across the state's eastern coastline; Hillsboro Inlet Light near Fort Lauderdale recorded sustained winds of 91 mph (146 km/h), and St. Augustine Light recorded a gust of 87 mph (140 km/h). Further inland, Jacksonville reported sustained winds of 72 mph (116 km/h) with gusts to 82 mph (132 km/h). Cape Canaveral, Melbourne, and Jupiter reported hurricane-force winds as well. In Jacksonville, Hurricane King left widespread power outages due to the winds knocking over trees and power lines. Street flooding was reported, and around 30 families required evacuation due to the storm. Between St. Augustine and Daytona Beach, the storm generated 8-foot (2.4 m) tides, flooding many homes along the Halifax River. Surging waters also caused a dike to collapse at Sebastian Inlet and flooded the Titusville area. Packinghouses and docks were wrecked on the Indian River, and seawalls were washed out at Cocoa Beach; up and down the east coast of the state a number of causeways and bridges were eroded. The cities of DeLand and Daytona Beach deemed the storm their worst in several years. At Clewiston, the storm generated tides of up to 19.3 ft (5.9 m), and hurricane-force winds swept the eastern side of Lake Okeechobee.

Overall, there were 50 injuries in the state, as well as at least three deaths. Two of them – a woman in West Hollywood and a man in Hallandale – were killed when their houses collapsed from the strong winds. The third death occurred in Sanford when a boy drowned in a flooded stream. There were also unconfirmed reports of a fourth person drowning when his boat capsized west of Bunnell. The hurricane was one of two major hurricanes – a Category 3 or higher on the Saffir-Simpson scale – to hit the state in 1950. It was the first time on record that two storms of such intensity hit Florida in the same year, and has only been repeated since in 2004 with hurricanes Charley and Jeanne, and in 2005 with hurricanes Dennis and Wilma.

=== Elsewhere in the United States ===
Later in its duration, King moved into Georgia as a weakening tropical storm before dissipating. The storm brought heavy rainfall and wind gusts of up to 55 mph (89 km/h), causing a three-hour power outage in Valdosta and downing several trees. Across the state, King produced $250,000 in damage (1950 USD) and caused one death.

Throughout the United States, Hurricane King caused four deaths and $30 million in damage (1950 USD). The hurricane also caused 199 injuries, of which 16 were severe.

== Aftermath ==
After the hurricane's passage, officials deployed the Florida National Guard to affected areas in order to maintain order and quell looting. Across Florida, a total of 3,897 people filed damage claims after receiving damage from the hurricane, 80% of them in the Miami area. Insurance companies paid about $1 million to compensate for the storm damage. Due to the loss in citrus crop, prices briefly increased, although they returned to normal levels by late October.

The name King was not used again after the season, although it was on the naming list for 1951 and 1952 due to being part of the Joint Army/Navy Phonetic Alphabet. The Phonetic Alphabet was decommissioned in 1953 in favor of using female names. Based on population growth in south Florida, it is estimated that a storm identical to Hurricane King would cause $2.8 billion in insured damage if it struck in 2001, with the total roughly split between Broward and Miami-Dade counties.

== See also ==
- Hurricane Andrew – Last major hurricane to affect Greater Miami
- List of Category 4 Atlantic hurricanes
- List of Cuba hurricanes
- List of Florida hurricanes (1950–1974)

== Sources ==
- Barnes, Jay (1998). Florida's Hurricane History (1st ed.). Chapel Hill, North Carolina: UNC Press. ISBN 0-8078-2443-7 – via Internet Archive.
- Bush, David M.; Neal, William J.; Longo, Norma J.; et al. (2004). Pilkey, Orrin H.; Neal, William J. (eds.). Living with Florida's Atlantic Beaches: Coastal Hazards from Amelia Island to Key West. Living with the Shore. Durham, North Carolina: Duke University Press. ISBN 978-0-822-33289-3 – via Internet Archive.
- Doehring, Fred; Duedall, Iver W.; Williams, John M. (June 1994). Florida Hurricanes and Tropical Storms, 1871–1993: An Historical Survey (Technical report). Technical Paper. Gainesville, Florida: Florida Sea Grant. 71, Florida Hurricanes and Tropical Storms – via National Oceanic and Atmospheric Administration.
  - Williams, John M.; Duedall, Iver W. (2002) [1997]. Florida Hurricanes and Tropical Storms, 1871–2001 (2nd ed.). Gainesville: University Press of Florida. ISBN 0-8130-2494-3 – via Internet Archive.
- Landsea, Christopher W.; Strahan-Sakoskie, Donna; Hagen, Andrew (July 2012). "A Reanalysis of the 1944–53 Atlantic Hurricane Seasons—The First Decade of Aircraft Reconnaissance" (PDF). Journal of Climate. 25 (13). Boston: American Meteorological Society: 4441–4460. Bibcode:2012JCli...25.4441H. doi:10.1175/JCLI-D-11-00419.1 – via Atlantic Oceanographic and Meteorological Laboratory.
- Norcross, Bryan (2007). Hurricane Almanac: The Essential Guide to Storms Past, Present, and Future (2nd ed.). St. Martin's Griffin. ISBN 978-0312371524 – via Internet Archive.
- Tannehill, I. R. (1952) [1938]. Hurricanes: Their Nature and History (8th ed.). Princeton, New Jersey: Princeton University Press. OCLC 3024697 – via Internet Archive.
