= Hurricane Baker (1950) =

Category 2 Atlantic hurricane in 1950

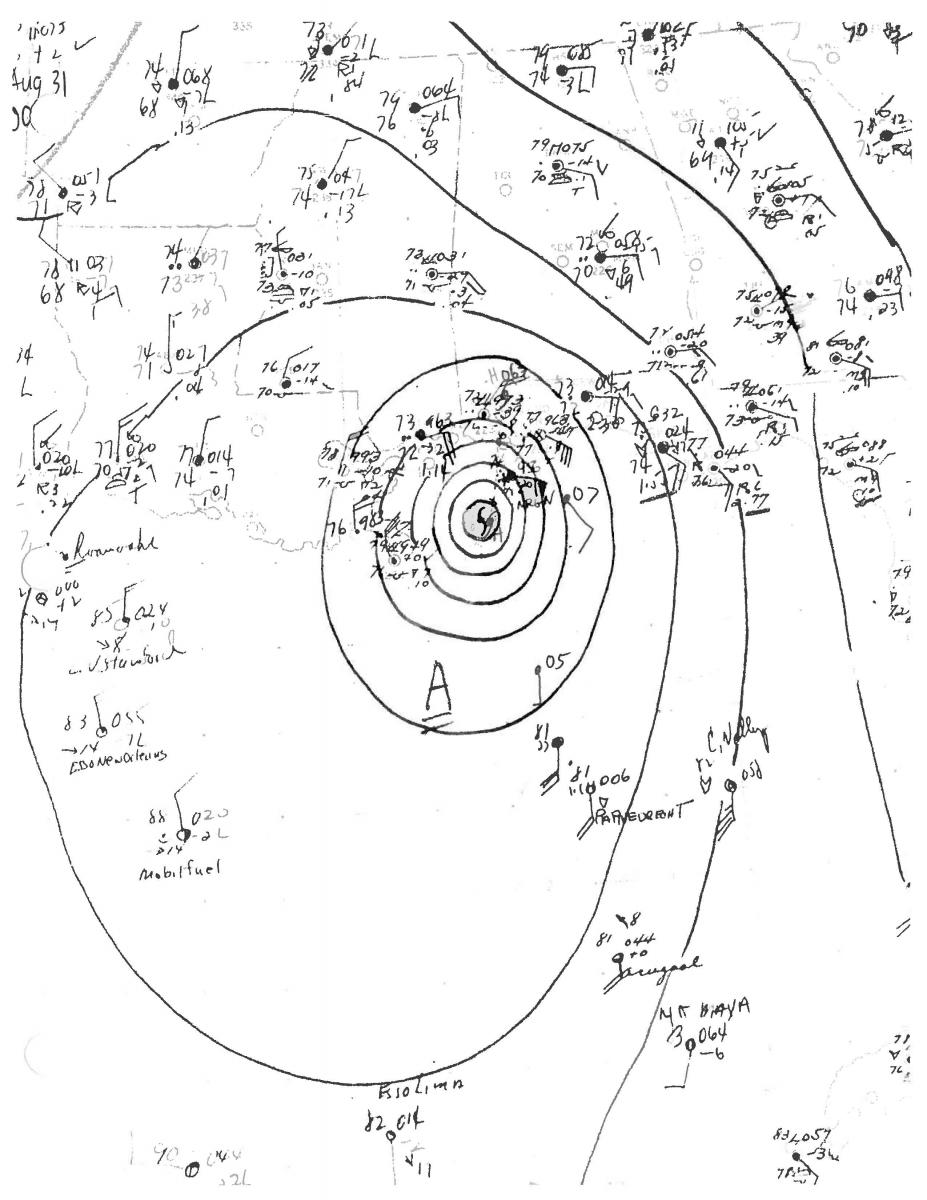
- Surface weather map of the cyclone nearing United States landfall on August 31

Meteorological history
- Formed: August 18, 1950
- Dissipated: September 1, 1950

Category 2 hurricane
- 1-minute sustained (SSHWS/NWS)
- Highest winds: 105 mph (165 km/h)
- Lowest pressure: ≤978 mbar (hPa); ≤28.88 inHg (lowest directly measured)

Overall effects
- Fatalities: 38 direct
- Damage: $2.55 million (1950 USD)
- Areas affected: Leeward Islands; Puerto Rico; Hispaniola; Cuba; Gulf Coast of the United States
- IBTrACS
- Part of the 1950 Atlantic hurricane season

Hurricane Baker was a Category 2 hurricane that affected the Leeward Islands, Greater Antilles, and the Gulf Coast of the United States. The tropical cyclone was the second tropical storm and second hurricane of the 1950 Atlantic hurricane season. Originating as a tropical depression east of the Windward Islands on August 18, Baker became a tropical storm on August 19, and further intensified into a hurricane on August 21. It attained an initial peak intensity with maximum sustained winds of 100 mph (160 km/h) on August 22 before weakening to a tropical storm as it made landfall on the island of Antigua. Baker weakened to a tropical depression late on August 23 while southwest of Puerto Rico. By the following morning, it had restrengthened into a tropical storm, though a landfall in Cuba caused it to weaken once again. Entering the Gulf of Mexico, Baker began to strengthen once more, regaining hurricane strength on August 29 and reaching its peak intensity with maximum sustained winds of 105 mph (169 km/h) early the following day. The cyclone weakened before making its final landfall in the United States near Gulf Shores, Alabama, with winds of 85 mph (137 km/h). Hurricane Baker produced extensive damage in the Lesser Antilles and Cuba, but impacts were minimal in the United States.

== Meteorological history ==
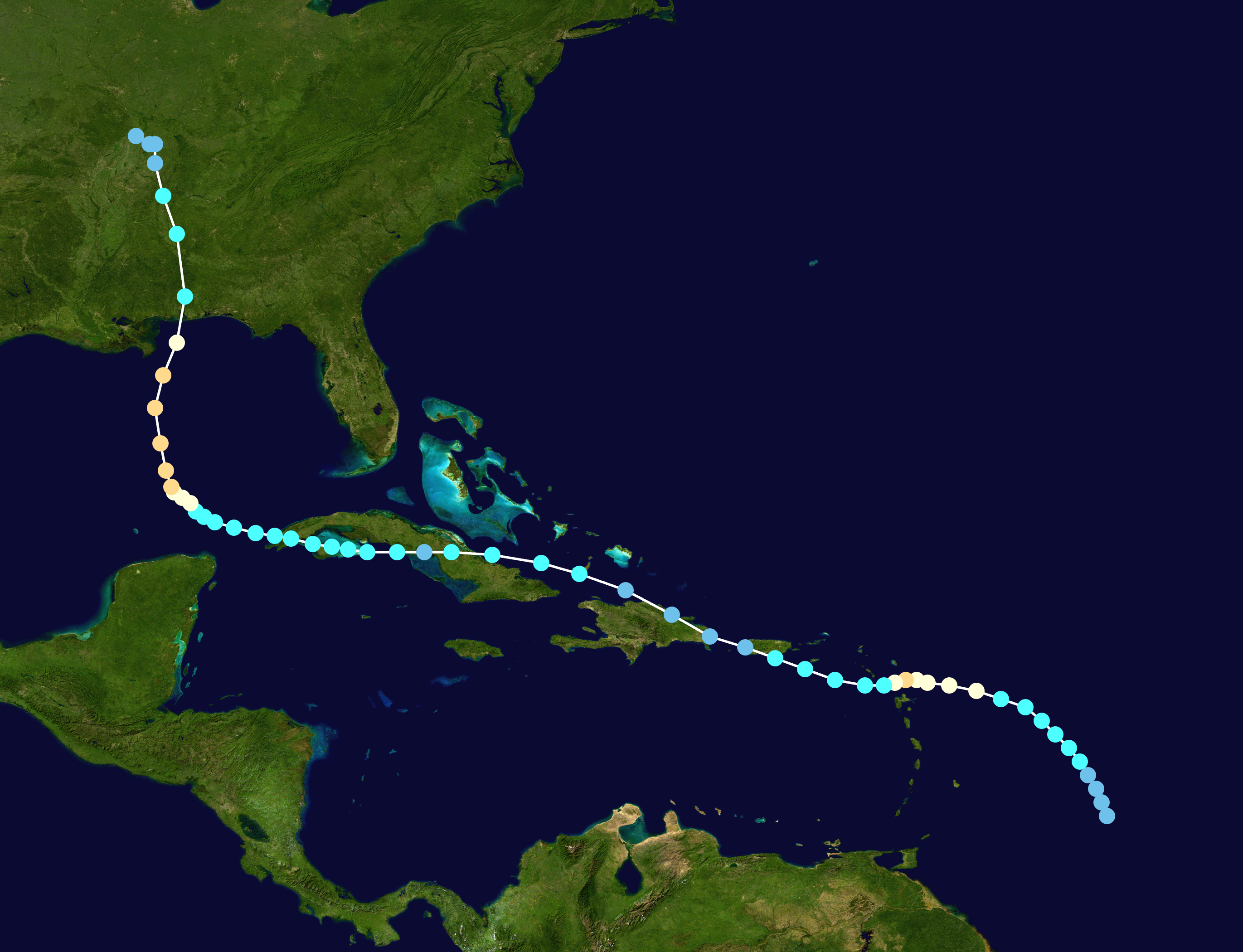
Map plotting the storm's track and intensity, according to the Saffir–Simpson scale Map key Saffir–Simpson scale Tropical depression (≤38 mph, ≤62 km/h) Tropical storm (39–73 mph, 63–118 km/h) Category 1 (74–95 mph, 119–153 km/h) Category 2 (96–110 mph, 154–177 km/h) Category 3 (111–129 mph, 178–208 km/h) Category 4 (130–156 mph, 209–251 km/h) Category 5 (≥157 mph, ≥252 km/h) Unknown Storm type Tropical cyclone Subtropical cyclone Extratropical cyclone, remnant low, tropical disturbance, or monsoon depression

Baker originated in a tropical wave off West Africa on August 13. The wave crossed the tropical Atlantic, reaching a point 380 mi (610 km) east-southeast of Barbados, the easternmost Caribbean island, five days later. A review of weather reports showed a closed low-pressure area, with the hurricane databases (HURDAT) initiating a tropical depression by 12:00 UTC, two days before the United States Weather Bureau noted a storm in its annual summary. Over the next few days it curled north-northwest and northwest, becoming a tropical storm on August 20. Next day a ship reported winds of 69 mph (111 km/h), and a reconnaissance airplane sighted a small, nascent eye. The plane also sampled a pressure of 987 mb (29.1 inHg), which implied sustained winds of 80 mph (130 km/h) based on pressure–wind relations and the compact eye size. (Note: According to meteorologist Ivan Ray Tannehill, the storm was already a "fully developed hurricane" by then.) Baker curved westward as it intensified, passing near Antigua early on August 22 with winds of 105 mph (165 km/h). (Note: Equal to Category 2 on the Saffir–Simpson scale.)

Within hours it swiftly weakened, hitting Montserrat with winds of 70 mph (110 km/h). Further degradation ensued, with weather stations and aircraft indicating a moderate tropical storm. On August 23 Baker turned west-northwest and moved ashore Puerto Rico near Ponce with winds of 40 mph (65 km/h). It soon shed gales after moving inland. Depicted as a "squally wave" by the Monthly Weather Review, it then crossed the Mona Passage and the easternmost Dominican Republic, reemerging offshore within a day. Its diffuse center may have reformed at least once, recouping distinctness near Great Inagua Island on August 24. It then regained tropical-storm status and turned west, striking Cayo Sabinal, Cuba, a day later with winds of 50 mph (85 km/h). (Note: Contemporary forecasters first noticed redevelopment off southern Cuba.) It briefly lost and then reattained storm status, reentering the Caribbean near Trinidad. Skirting the Isla de la Juventud, Baker hit the western Cuban mainland on August 27 with winds of 60 mph (95 km/h).

Reaching the Gulf of Mexico, Baker meandered and strengthened over the next few days. At one point its motion slowed to 5 mph (8.0 km/h), the least since Antigua. At the same time its path gradually bent northward, initially threatening Louisiana. Although aircraft failed to detect an eye, Baker recovered hurricane winds on August 29. On August 30 aircraft logged flight-level winds of 115 mph (185 km/h), and a barometer aboard the vessel Mather—at an unknown proximity to the eye—read 978 mb (28.9 inHg). As these measurements were made outside the eye, Baker is estimated to have peaked once more at 105 mph (165 km/h). It then veered north-northeast, coursing toward Alabama and northwest Florida. The cyclone diminished in intensity prior to landfall. At 03:00 UTC on August 31, Baker struck Fort Morgan, Alabama, with winds of 85 mph (140 km/h). Moving up Mobile Bay, it made a second landfall at Spanish Fort an hour later with the same winds. A blend of lower-than-usual ambient pressures, wind data, and a near-average radius of maximum wind (RMW)—along with a central pressure reading of 979 mb (28.9 inHg)—justified the landfall winds; these made it a Category 1 hurricane in Alabama. After landfall Baker slowly unraveled, swerving north-northwest across interior Alabama. It degenerated into a tropical storm, and a day later weakened to a depression before dissipating over southeastern Missouri.

== Warnings, preparations, and impact ==
On August 21 the Weather Bureau issued hurricane warnings between Saint Martin and Guadeloupe—a pair of islands in the Leewards—and for the United States Virgin Islands of Saint John, Saint Croix, and Saint Thomas. The agency also advised shipping and other interests in the northeastern Caribbean to take precautions, including on the islands of Antigua and Puerto Rico. A day later it shelved all bulletins, due to a downtrend in the storm. On August 25 small craft advisories were posted in South Florida below Naples and Vero Beach, including the Keys. 500 United States Navy aircraft relocated from stations at New Orleans and Pensacola. Oil firms evacuated crews aboard offshore rigs near Grand Isle, Louisiana.

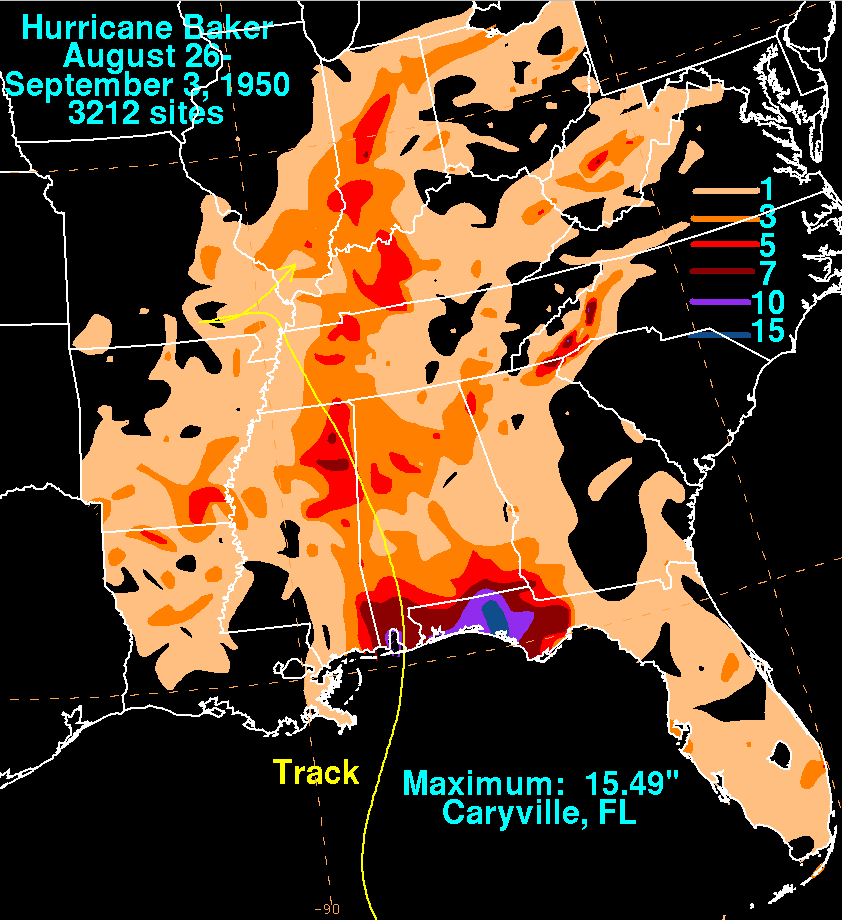
Rainfall from Hurricane Baker in the United States.

On Antigua, the PanAm station's power failed when winds reached 85 mph (137 km/h) around midnight on August 23. Unofficial estimates placed winds between 95–120 mph (153–193 km/h) at the location. A 2012 study found that sustained velocities on Antigua likely reached 100 mph (160 km/h). Baker dropped heavy rains over the island as well. While the first reports only noted light damage, later accounts indicated extensive damage. More than 100 homes were destroyed or damaged in the Willkie and Piggott areas. Winds razed large homes in Prestown, along with a manse. Electronic communications were dismantled, and thousands of homeless people sheltered in churches and schools. No deaths occurred on the island, but damages were expected to reach several thousand dollars. The storm also unroofed sugar warehouses and felled trees. In all, it leveled at least 40 homes. In the capital St. John's several hundred dead cattle lay in the streets. A pair of fires ignited during the storm, incinerating the Globe Hotel and annex, the second-biggest lodge on the island. The blaze also engulfed a bakery and the Colonial Secretariat office.

In Barbados the edge of the storm dumped prolific rains, causing some flood-related losses. Across Puerto Rico Baker generated winds of 35 to 40 mph (56 to 64 km/h), slightly damaging signs, awnings, and electric wires. Similar impacts occurred in the nearby Virgin Islands. Locally copious rainfall caused some streams to overflow, disrupting agricultural and construction work. In Cuba, 37 people died, and the property losses reached several million dollars. Flash floods swamped large tracts, and crops were ruined. Winds over southern Florida and the Straits of Florida peaked at 28 to 40 mph (45 to 64 km/h).

In the United States, the greatest property and crop damage occurred from Mobile, Alabama, to St. Marks, Florida, where losses approached $2.55 million; high tides and winds inflicted minimal damage in both cities. Panama City, Florida, incurred heavy damage to homes and businesses from high tides and rainfall, which peaked at 14.96 in (380 mm). The highest rainfall total was 15.49 in (393 mm) at Caryville. Peak gusts exceeded 100 mph (160 km/h) on Santa Rosa Island. 200 to 300 cottages received damage in Panama City, and homes were flooded near the bay. Losses reached $200,000 in Gulf Shores, Alabama, with an additional $550,000 in northwest Florida.

Hurricane Baker spawned two tornadoes. On August 30, a F1 tornado touched down in Apalachicola, Florida, destroying four dwellings and a store building and damaging another eleven buildings. On August 31, a F0 tornado demolished one building near Marianna, Florida, in Jackson County. Inland, Birmingham International Airport recorded 50 mph (80 km/h) wind gusts; higher gusts were estimated near 75 mph (121 km/h) in elevated, mountainous locations. Hundreds of trees were prostrated as far north as the Birmingham, Alabama area, and one person was killed and two more injured by live wires falling from utility poles.

== See also ==
- List of Category 2 Atlantic hurricanes
- List of Florida hurricanes
- List of United States hurricanes
- List of Atlantic hurricanes
