= 1981 hurricane season =

1981 hurricane season may refer to:

- The 1981 Atlantic hurricane season
- The 1981 Pacific hurricane season
