= 1981 North Indian Ocean cyclone season =

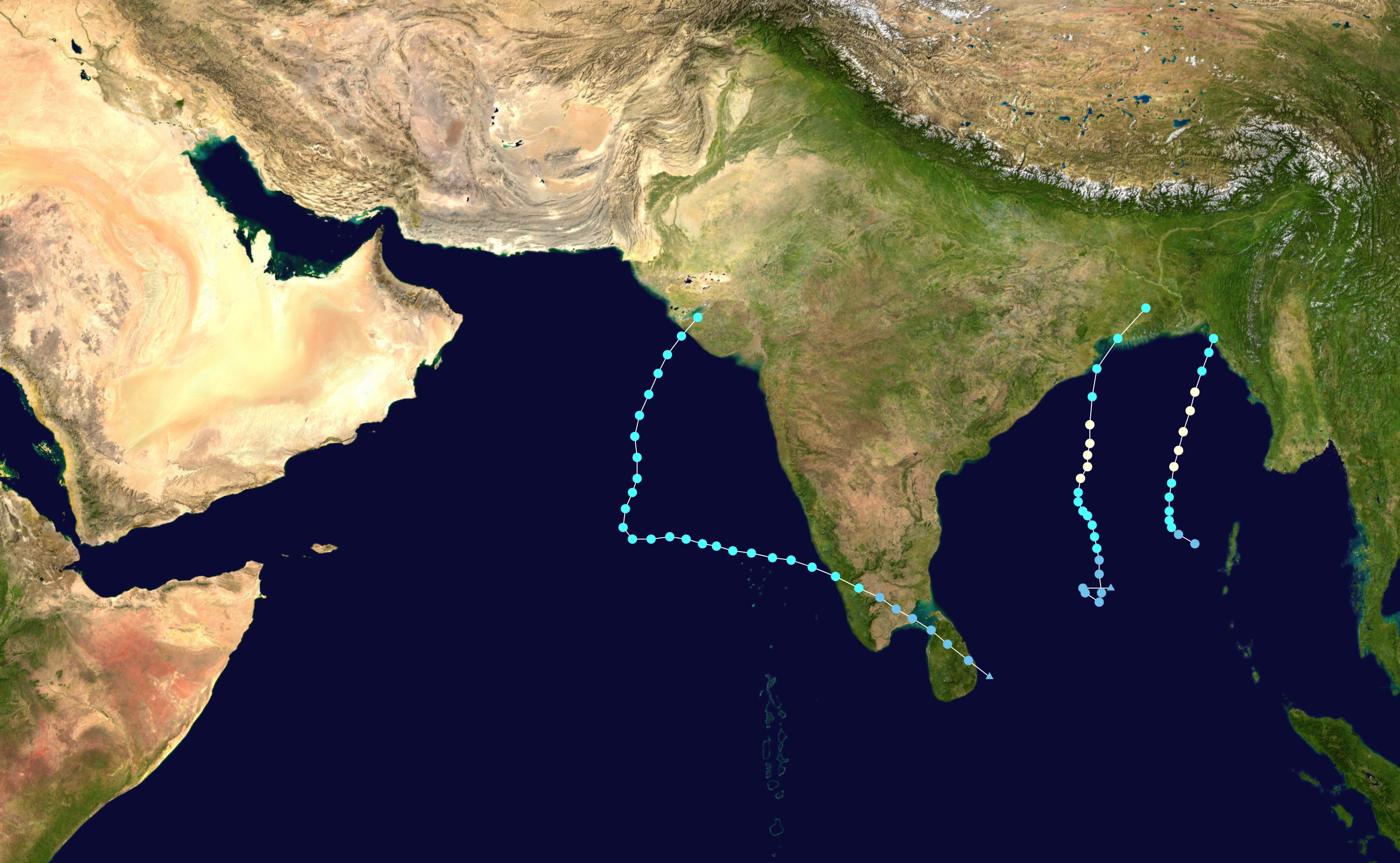
- Season summary map

Seasonal boundaries
- First system formed: June 20, 1981
- Last system dissipated: December 11, 1981

Strongest storm
- Name: 02B & 03B
  - Maximum winds: 120 km/h (75 mph) (3-minute sustained)
  - Lowest pressure: 964 hPa (mbar)

Seasonal statistics
- Depressions: 12
- Cyclonic storms: 5
- Severe cyclonic storms: 3
- Total fatalities: >200
- Total damage: Unknown

Related articles
- 1981 Atlantic hurricane season; 1981 Pacific hurricane season; 1981 Pacific typhoon season

The 1981 North Indian Ocean cyclone season was part of the annual cycle of tropical cyclone formation. A season has no official bounds but cyclones tend to form between April and December. These dates conventionally delimit the period of each year when most tropical cyclones form in the northern Indian Ocean. There are two main seas in the North Indian Ocean—the Bay of Bengal to the east of the Indian subcontinent and the Arabian Sea to the west of India. The official Regional Specialized Meteorological Centre in this basin is the India Meteorological Department (IMD), while the Joint Typhoon Warning Center (JTWC) releases unofficial advisories. An average of five tropical cyclones form in the North Indian Ocean every season with peaks in May and November. Cyclones occurring between the meridians 45°E and 100°E are included in the season by the IMD.

== Systems ==
=== Tropical Storm One (1B) ===
- Very severe cyclonic storm (IMD)
- Tropical storm (SSHWS)
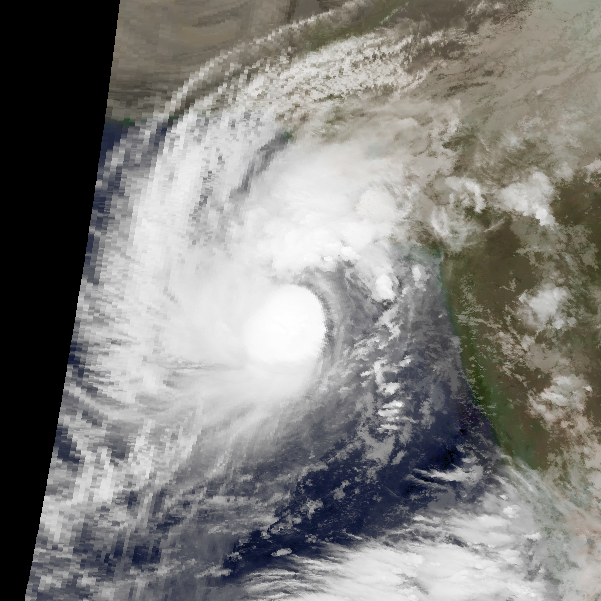
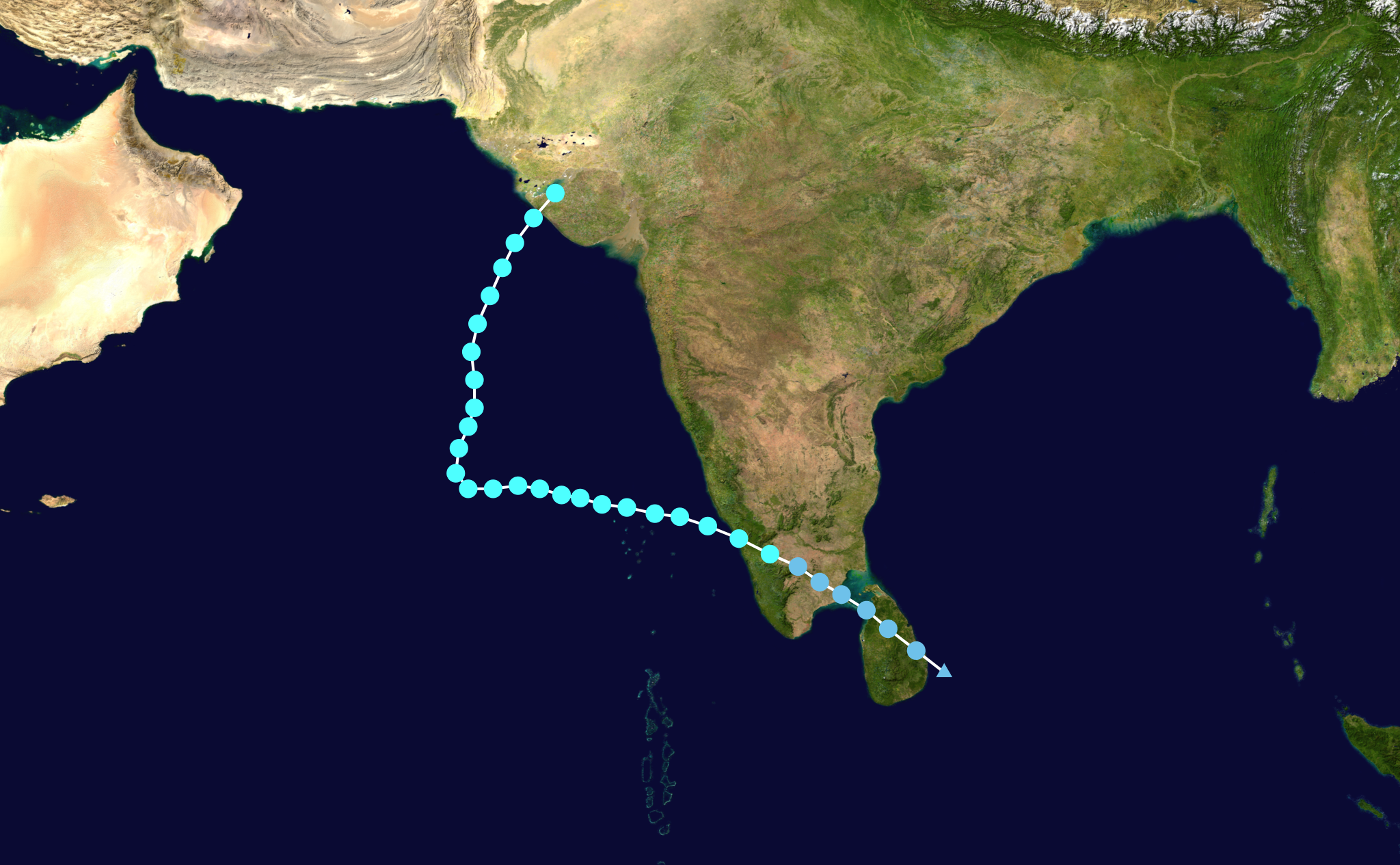
- Duration: October 28 – November 3
- Peak intensity: 120 km/h (75 mph) (3-min); 979 hPa (mbar)

The monsoon trough spawned a tropical depression just east of Sri Lanka on October 25. The depression tracked northwestward, becoming a tropical storm on the 27th over southern India according to the JTWC. Over the Arabian Sea, it turned northeastward where, after reaching a peak of 120 km/h (75 mph) winds, it hit western India on November 2 as it recurved northeastward. The IMD last reported the system on November 3. Nearly 5700 huts were reported to be damaged due to gust winds over Gujarat at the time of landfall.

=== Cyclone Two (2B) ===
- Very severe cyclonic storm (IMD)
- Category 1 tropical cyclone (SSHWS)
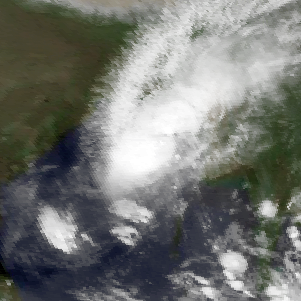
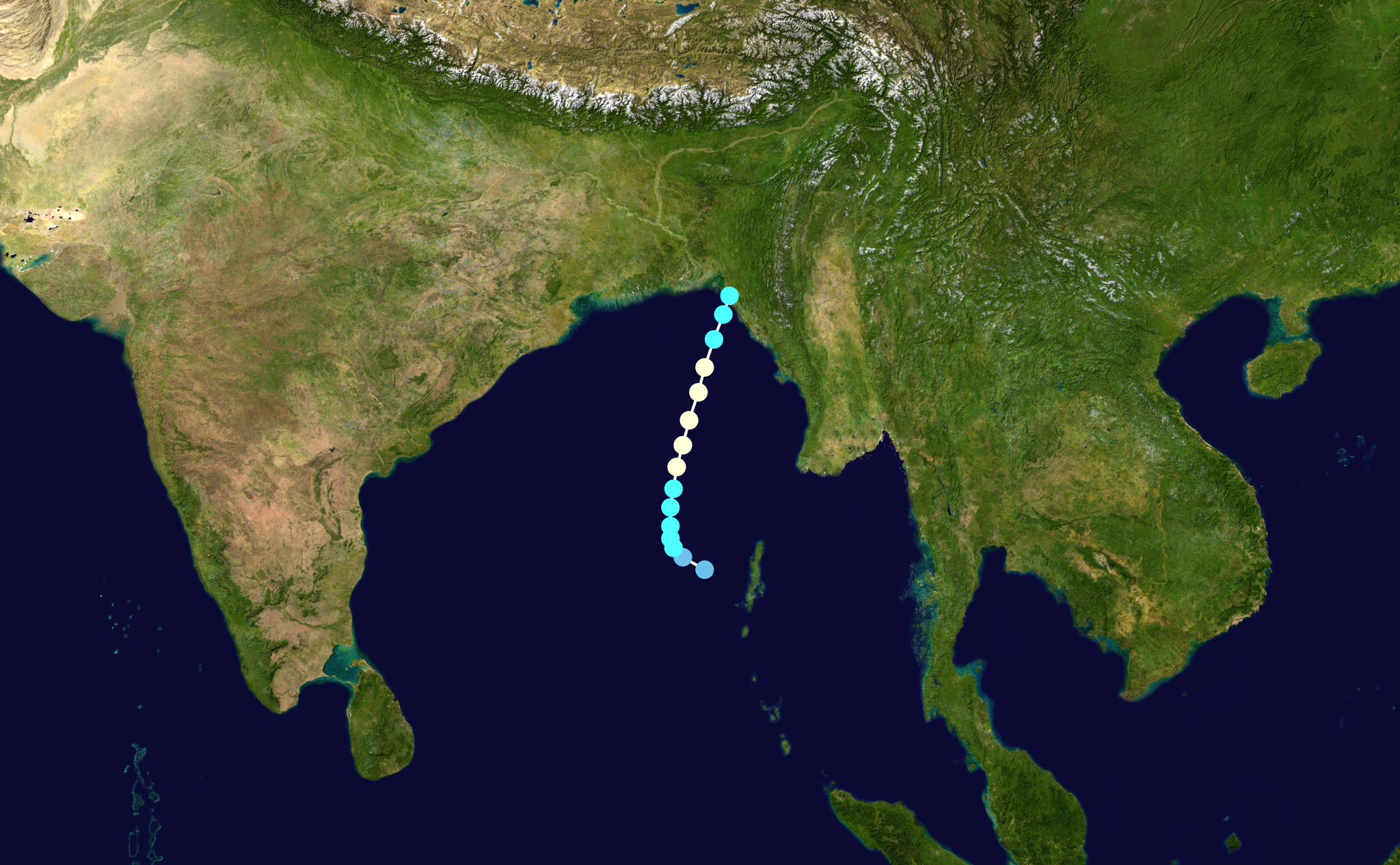
- Duration: November 17 – November 20
- Peak intensity: 120 km/h (75 mph) (3-min); 964 hPa (mbar)

On November 20, Tropical Storm Two, having weakened from a cyclone that developed on the 17th, hit Bangladesh and dissipated soon after.

=== Cyclone Three (3B) ===
- Very severe cyclonic storm (IMD)
- Category 1 tropical cyclone (SSHWS)
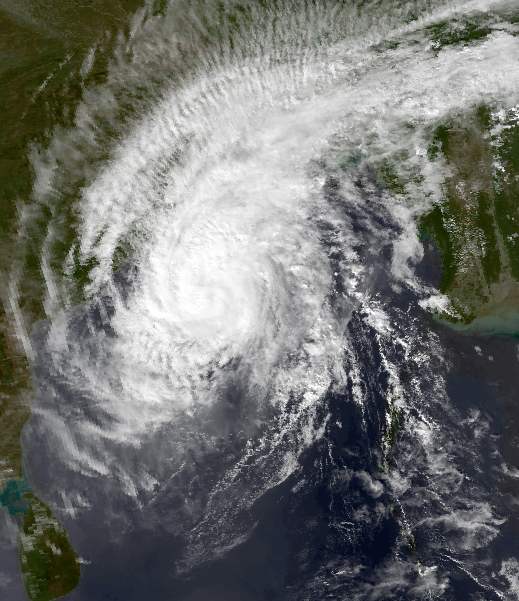
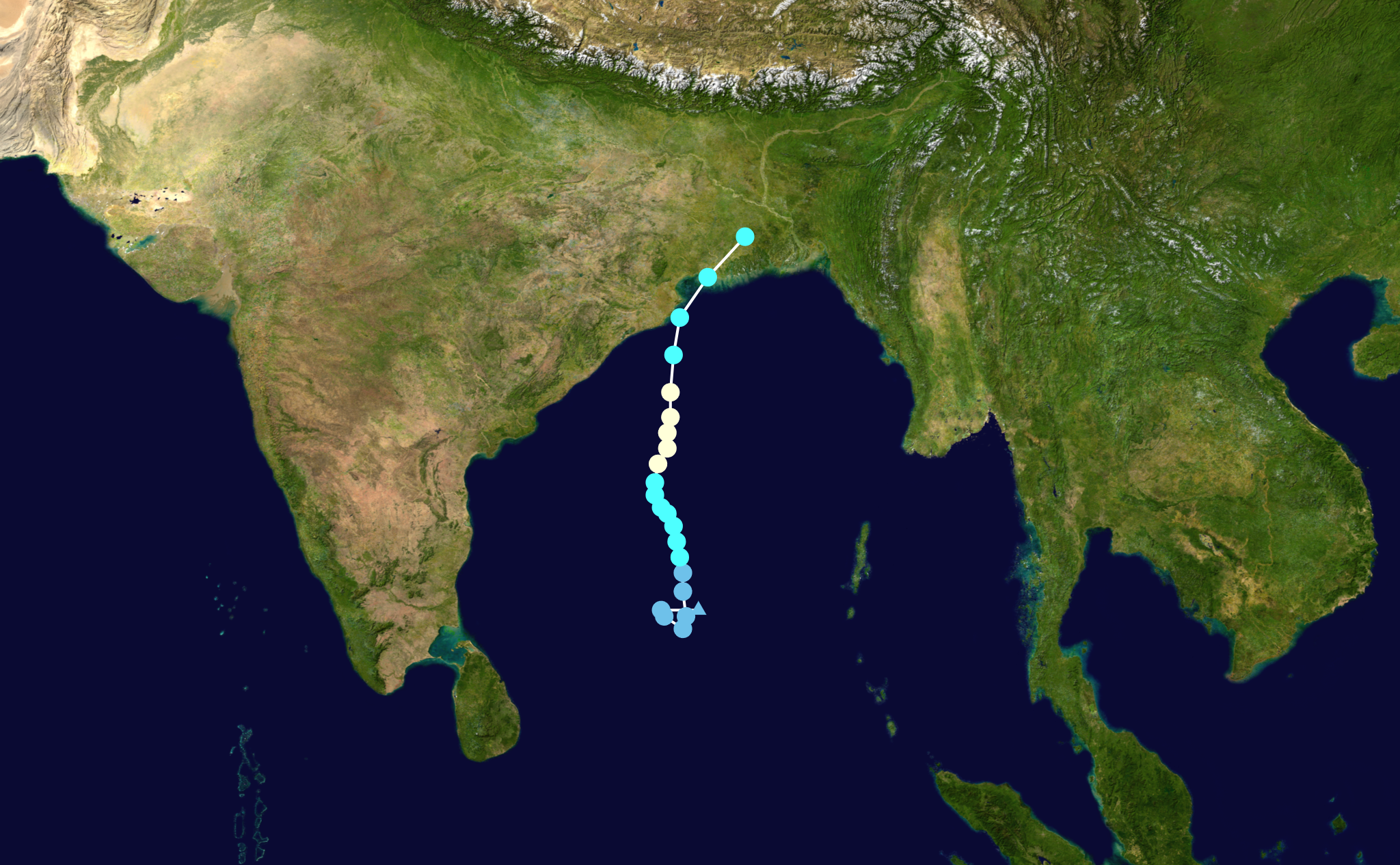
- Duration: December 4 – December 11
- Peak intensity: 120 km/h (75 mph) (3-min); 964 hPa (mbar)

Cyclone Three, which formed from the monsoon trough in the Bay of Bengal on December 5, reached a peak of 85 mph winds on the 9th. It weakened as it continued northward, and hit near the Indian/Bangladesh border on 1300UTC of 10th as a 60 mph tropical storm. Widespread damage and flooding caused at least 200 fatalities and affected one million people.

=== Other systems ===
- There were 12 depressions that developed during the season. The first formed on June 20 in the northern Bay of Bengal. It soon moved ashore and dissipated on June 24. In August, there were two depressions and a cyclonic storm in the Bay of Bengal. The first formed in the Bay of Bengal on August 3, which dissipated after moving ashore eastern India the next day. The other formed on August 12, moved ashore two days later, and dissipated on August 16. A land depression existed over eastern India on September 9. Another Bay of Bengal depression formed on September 17 and moved ashore India a day later. From October 31 to November 2, a depression existed in the central Bay of Bengal. A depression existed off southwest Myanmar from November 8–10.
- On August 7, a cyclonic storm formed in the northern Bay of Bengal. It moved ashore Odisha the next day, and progressed northwestward through India. It was last observed on August 10 over western India.
- A depression formed in the Bay of Bengal on September 24, and quickly intensified into a cyclonic storm while moving northwestward. On September 26, the storm moved ashore Odisha. It eventually turned northward, dissipating over Chhattisgarh on September 28. Many huts were reported to be damaged due to gust winds over the coastal villages of Odisha.

== See also ==
- North Indian Ocean tropical cyclone
- 1981 Atlantic hurricane season
- 1981 Pacific hurricane season
- 1981 Pacific typhoon season
- Australian cyclone seasons: 1980–81, 1981–82
- South Pacific cyclone seasons: 1980–81, 1981–82
- South-West Indian Ocean cyclone seasons: 1980–81, 1981–82
