= Hurricane Norma (1981) =

Category 3 Pacific hurricane in 1981

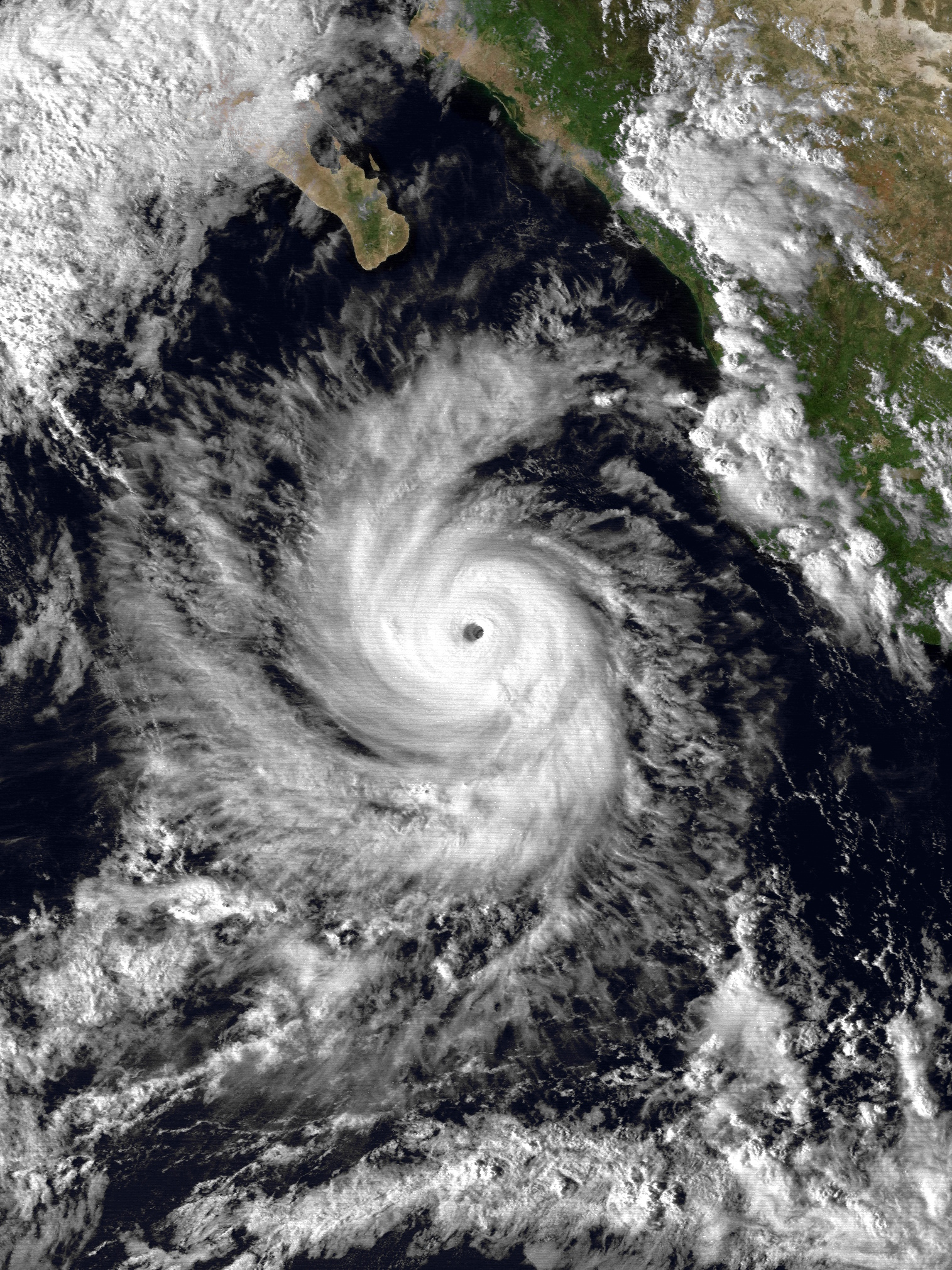
- Norma at peak intensity on October 10

Meteorological history
- Formed: October 8, 1981
- Dissipated: October 12, 1981

Category 3 major hurricane
- 1-minute sustained (SSHWS/NWS)
- Highest winds: 125 mph (205 km/h)

Overall effects
- Fatalities: 1 direct, 5 indirect
- Damage: $74 million (1981 USD)
- Areas affected: Mexico, Texas
- IBTrACS
- Part of the 1981 Pacific hurricane season

Hurricane Norma was one of the two hurricanes to make landfall during the 1981 Pacific hurricane season. It developed on October 8, strengthening into a tropical storm and later a hurricane. Norma moved slowly to the northwest and strengthened into a Category 3 hurricane on the Saffir–Simpson hurricane scale. The storm recurved and accelerated to the northeast on October 11 and weakened to a Category 2. The next day, Norma made landfall near Mazatlán on October 12 and soon dissipated. The hurricane's remnants continued northeastward and entered the United States, crossing into central Texas before being absorbed by a frontal system on October 14. Norma caused $24 million in crop damage and one death in Mexico, as well as up to 10 in (250 mm). In Texas, the storm produced flooding rains that killed five people, caused $50 million in damage and caused many tornadoes. Rainfall was also reported as far inland as Kansas.

== Meteorological history ==
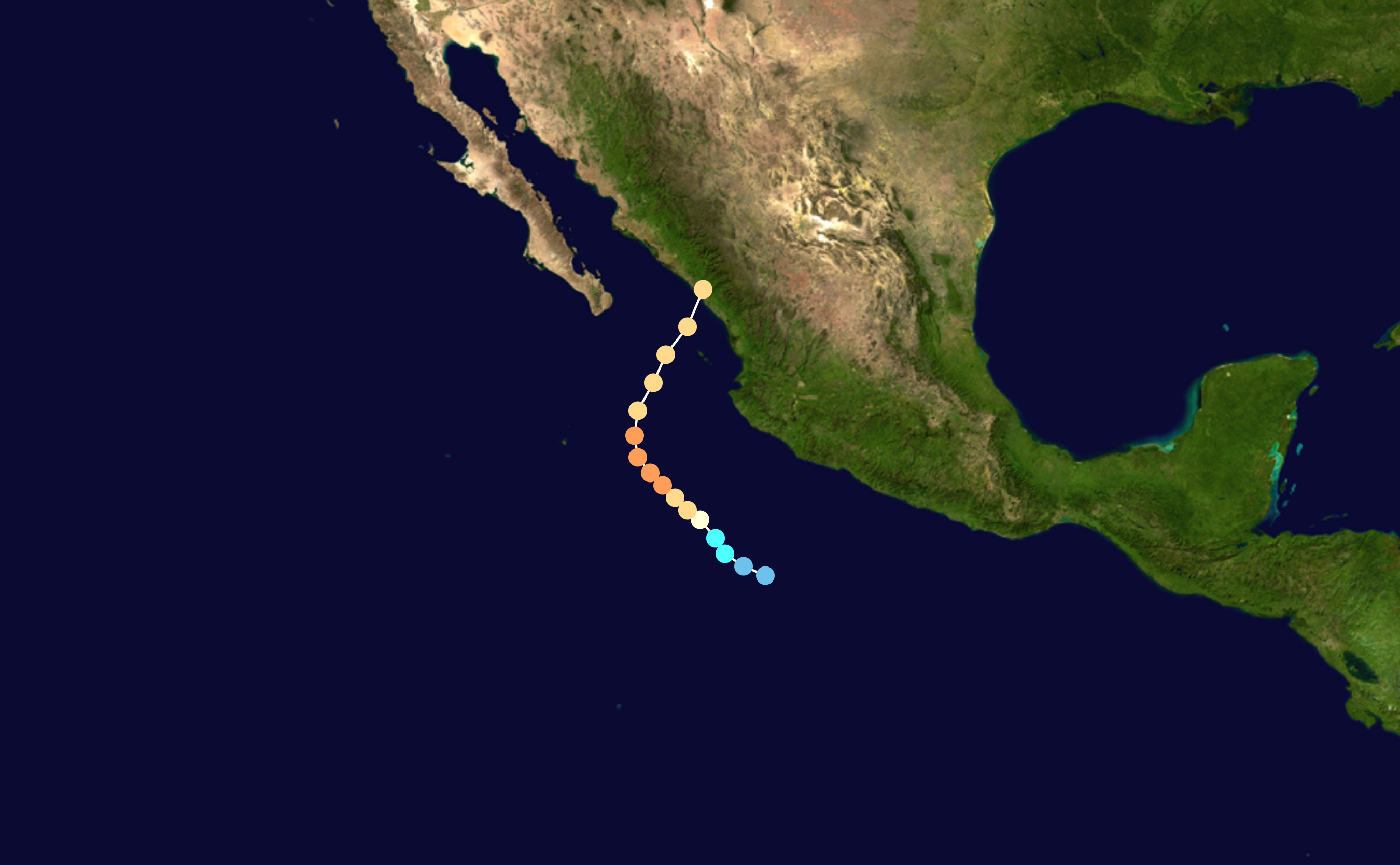
Map plotting the storm's track and intensity, according to the Saffir–Simpson scale Map key Saffir–Simpson scale Tropical depression (≤38 mph, ≤62 km/h) Tropical storm (39–73 mph, 63–118 km/h) Category 1 (74–95 mph, 119–153 km/h) Category 2 (96–110 mph, 154–177 km/h) Category 3 (111–129 mph, 178–208 km/h) Category 4 (130–156 mph, 209–251 km/h) Category 5 (≥157 mph, ≥252 km/h) Unknown Storm type Tropical cyclone Subtropical cyclone Extratropical cyclone, remnant low, tropical disturbance, or monsoon depression

Early on October 8, a tropical depression had developed far from land. Initially, the storm moved west-northwest, but it turned to the northwest six hours after forming. Over sea surface temperatures of 82 °F (28 °C), the storm intensified into Tropical Storm Norma at 0600 UTC . By midday on October 9, the winds had reached 50 mph (85 km/h) and on 1800 UTC October 9, the Eastern Pacific Hurricane Center upgraded the storm into a hurricane and a well-defined eye became visible via satellite imagery.

Upon reaching hurricane strength, Norma began to undergo a period rapid intensification; it reached Category 2 intensity on the Saffir–Simpson hurricane scale six hours later. Later that day, the storm reached major hurricane status, a storm with winds of 111 mph (179 km/h) or higher on the Saffir–Simpson hurricane scale.. The storm reached its peak of 125 mph (205 km/h) at 1800 UTC on October 10. Passing east of Socorro Island, the storm turned north and shortly thereafter north-northeast due to southwesterly flow over northwestern Mexico.

The storm began to accelerate while continuing to weaken; by 1200 UTC on October 11, the storm had weakened into a mid-level Category 2 hurricane. After briefly re-intensifying that night, Hurricane Norma made landfall just northeast of Mazatlan with winds of 105 mph (155 km/h) at 1000 UTC on October 12. Two hours later, advisories were discontinued as the center dissipated 46.5 mi (75 km) north of Mazatlan. However, a second area of low pressure formed over western Texas early on October 13. After producing heavy rains, the system was absorbed by a frontal system on October 14.

== Impact and aftermath ==
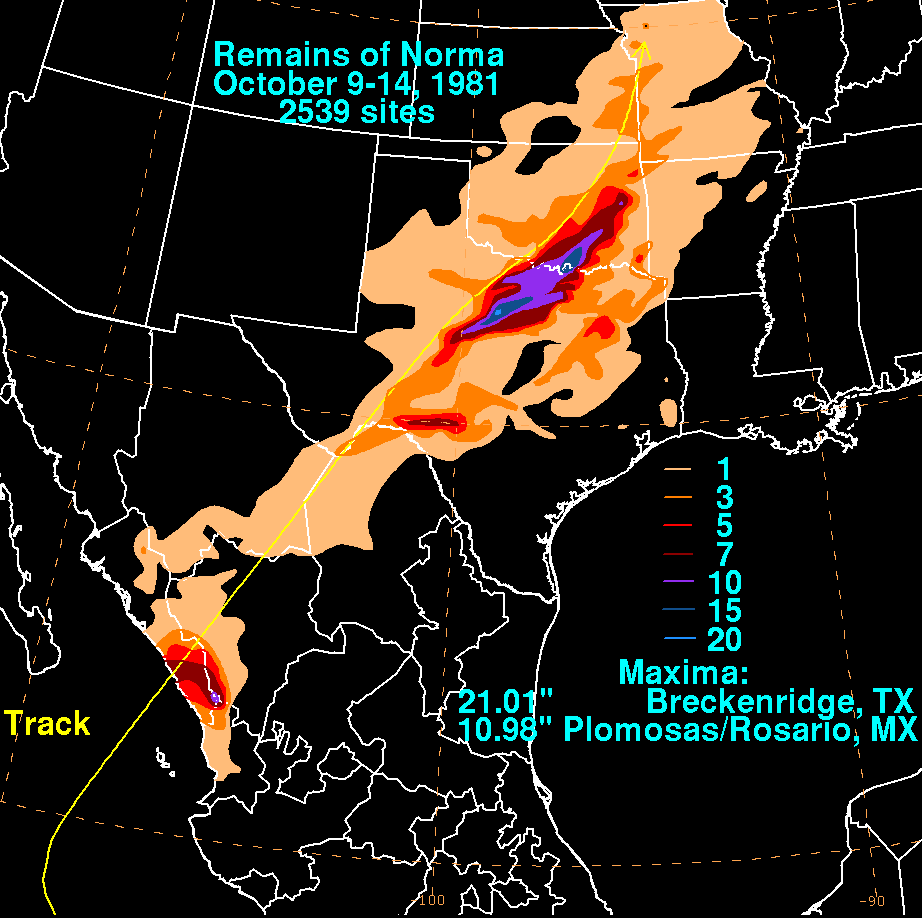
Rainfall summary of Hurricane Norma

=== Mexico ===
Four days before Norma moved through Sinaloa, Tropical Storm Lidia made landfall north of the area. Lidia killed 73 people and caused $60 million (equivalent to $212.48 million in 2025) in damage. This prompted evacuations of 5,000 people, and limited the death toll of Hurricane Norma to one person, a fisherman drowned when his boat capsized in the storm. The hurricane caused more devastation in the flood-ravaged region. Six soldiers were guarding a government helicopter, five of these soldiers were washed away during a flash flood. Agriculture was disrupted, and cattle were killed, causing at least $24 million (equivalent to $84.99 million in 2025) dollars in crop damage. The highest Mexican rainfall was 10.9 in (280 mm) in Plomosas/Rosario, Mexico. Torrential rains caused serious flooding north of Mazatlan. as well as ten nearby towns. Due to the damage from the storm, Antonio Toledo Corro, the Governor of Sinaloa, declared a state of emergency. Red Cross spokesperson noted that 5,000 residents need to be evacuated from low-lying areas.

=== United States ===
The remnants of the storm moved into Texas and Oklahoma. The heavy rainfall caused two rivers, the Red River and Cedar Creek to reach flood-stage. A total of five people were killed in the United States, three of these deaths occurred when floodwaters swept their car off the road in Fort Worth. Nearby, flooding forced thousands of people to evacuate their homes, including 1,000 people in the cities of Lindsay and Breckenridge. Several tornadoes were reported in six counties, including an F2 tornado in McLennan that injured four people and caused $25 million in damage. A F3 tornado was also reported in Navarro County, causing $25,000 in property damage. During October 13 and 14, a total of 13 tornadoes were reported in northern Texas and southern Oklahoma.

Cedar Creek overflowed its banks and homes in low-lying areas of Abilene, Texas were covered in 6 ft (1.8 m) of water. In Gainesville, floodwaters swept a train off its track. In the same area, 200 people were evacuated due to the flooding. Waco reported power losses for two hours and $2.8 million (equivalent to $9.92 million in 2025) in damage for churches and businesses. In Oklahoma, 60 bridges were washed away due to flooding, but no injuries or deaths were reported. In addition, a tornado struck a small town, causing minor damage to farms. The town of Bells reported winds of 75 mph (121 km/h). Total damage in Texas was estimated at $50 million (equivalent to $177.07 million in 2025).

Across Texas, 13 in (330 mm) fell between Bridgeport and Denton and up to 20 in (510 mm) fell in areas near Abilene and Gainesville. The storm produced 17.9 in (450 mm) of rain in a three-day period, thus causing Madill to have its wettest October on record. In addition, 20.1 in (510 mm) of rain fell in Breckenridge, Texas. In eastern Kansas light rain fell, including .7 in (18 mm) near Perry Lake within a 24‑hour period.

Due to the damage from the hurricane in the United States, the Salvation Army disaster units were sent throughout the devastated area. To prevent looting, residents in Breckenridge organized watches; the National Guard soon patrolled the streets. In Abilene, the United States Red Cross worked to feed the homeless and supply them with drinking water until city water services was restored.

== See also ==
- Other storms of the same name
- List of Pacific hurricanes
- List of Texas hurricanes
