= 1981 Pacific hurricane season =

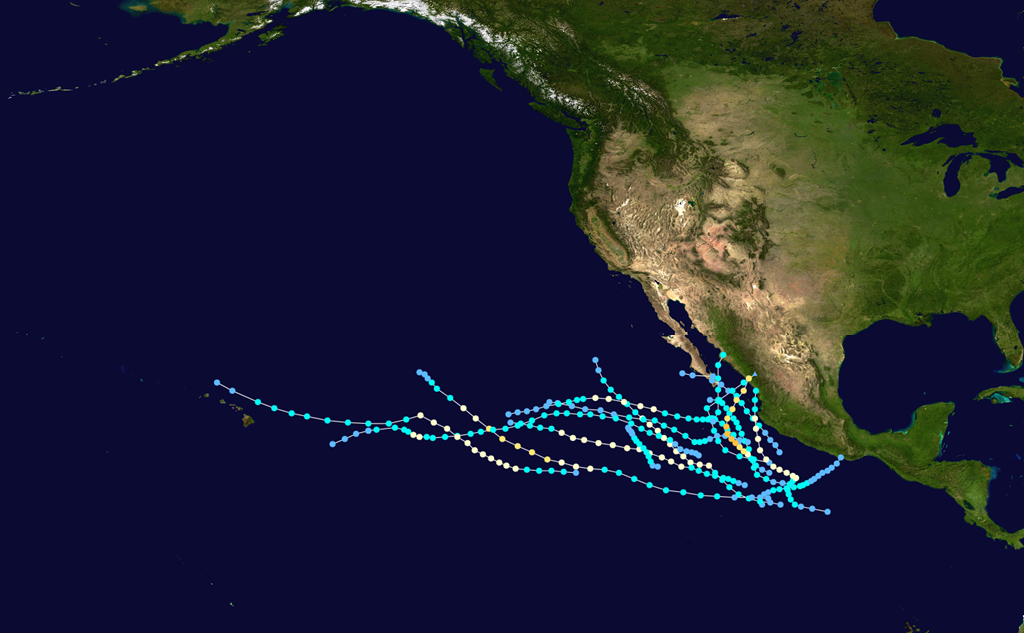
- Season summary map

Seasonal boundaries
- First system formed: May 30, 1981
- Last system dissipated: October 30, 1981

Strongest storm
- Name: Norma
  - Maximum winds: 125 mph (205 km/h) (1-minute sustained)

Seasonal statistics
- Total depressions: 17
- Total storms: 15
- Hurricanes: 8
- Major hurricanes (Cat. 3+): 1
- Total fatalities: 106 total
- Total damage: $154 million (1981 USD)

Related articles
- 1981 Atlantic hurricane season; 1981 Pacific typhoon season; 1981 North Indian Ocean cyclone season

The 1981 Pacific hurricane season was a slightly below average Pacific hurricane season. The season officially started on May 15 in the eastern Pacific basin and June 1 in the central Pacific basin. Both basins' seasons ended on November 30; these dates conventionally delimit the period during which most tropical cyclones form in the northeastern Pacific Ocean. The first tropical cyclone of the season was designated on May 30, and the final storm of the season, Hurricane Otis, dissipated on October 30. The season produced fifteen named storms and a total of eight hurricanes, which was near normal. However, the total of one major hurricane was below the average of three.

The strongest tropical cyclone of the season was Hurricane Norma, which was a powerful Category 3 hurricane on the Saffir–Simpson Hurricane Scale. The storm caused six deaths – five in Texas, and one in Mexico, due to severe flooding. Additionally, the storm caused $74 million (equivalent to $262.06 million in 2025) in damage, which is credited to significant crop damage and many tornadoes. However, the deadliest tropical cyclone of the season was Tropical Storm Lidia, which made two landfalls – one on the southern tip of the Baja California Peninsula and the other along the shores of Sinaloa in early October. As the result of its heavy rainfall in northwestern Mexico, seventy-three fatalities were reported, along with $80 million in damage.

== Seasonal summary ==
Least intense Pacific hurricane seasons
Rank	Season	ACE value
1	1977	22.3
2	2010	51.2
3	2007	51.6
4	1996	53.9
5	2003	56.6
6	1979	57.4
7	2004	71.1
8	1981	72.8
9	2013	74.8
10	2020	77.3

There was an absence in storm activity across the Central Pacific Hurricane Center's area of responsibility, as no storms developed in the basin. However, two tropical cyclones from the eastern Pacific, Greg and Jova, entered the central Pacific, the latter entering as a hurricane. The season produced fifteen named storms and eight hurricanes; both of these numbers were equal to the average. The season's one major hurricane, a storm with winds of at least 111 mph (179 km/h), was below the average of three. There are also at least two tropical depressions that did not strengthen into tropical storms. Six tropical cyclones made landfall in Mexico. First, Tropical Storm Adrian made landfall 240 mi (390 km) east-southeast of Acapulco, but did not cause any damage. Afterwards, Tropical Storm Irwin made landfall in Baja California Sur, but similarly to Adrian, did not cause any damage. Tropical Storm Knut later made landfall near Mazatlán with winds equivalent to a minimal tropical storm, but no deaths or damage was reported. Tropical Storm Lidia struck about 23 mi (37 km) south of Los Mochis on October 8, with winds of 45 mph (75 km/h). Heavy rainfall associated with the cyclone caused moderate damage in northwestern Mexico, and at least seventy-three deaths can be attributed to the storm. On May 30, an area of intense shower and thunderstorm activity located 270 mi (430 km) south of the Mexican coastline. The second to strike the area in 10 days, Norma was absorbed by a frontal system on October 14. The combined entity produced heavy rainfall and severe weather across Texas, which subsequently led to severe crop damage. The final storm to make landfall on Mexico during the 1981 season was Hurricane Otis. Intensifying into a hurricane by October 26, the hurricane brushed the coast of Jalisco before making landfall near Mazatlán at hurricane intensity on October 30. Otis was the second of two hurricanes to make landfall in the country this season.

== Systems ==
=== Tropical Storm Adrian ===
- Tropical storm (SSHWS)
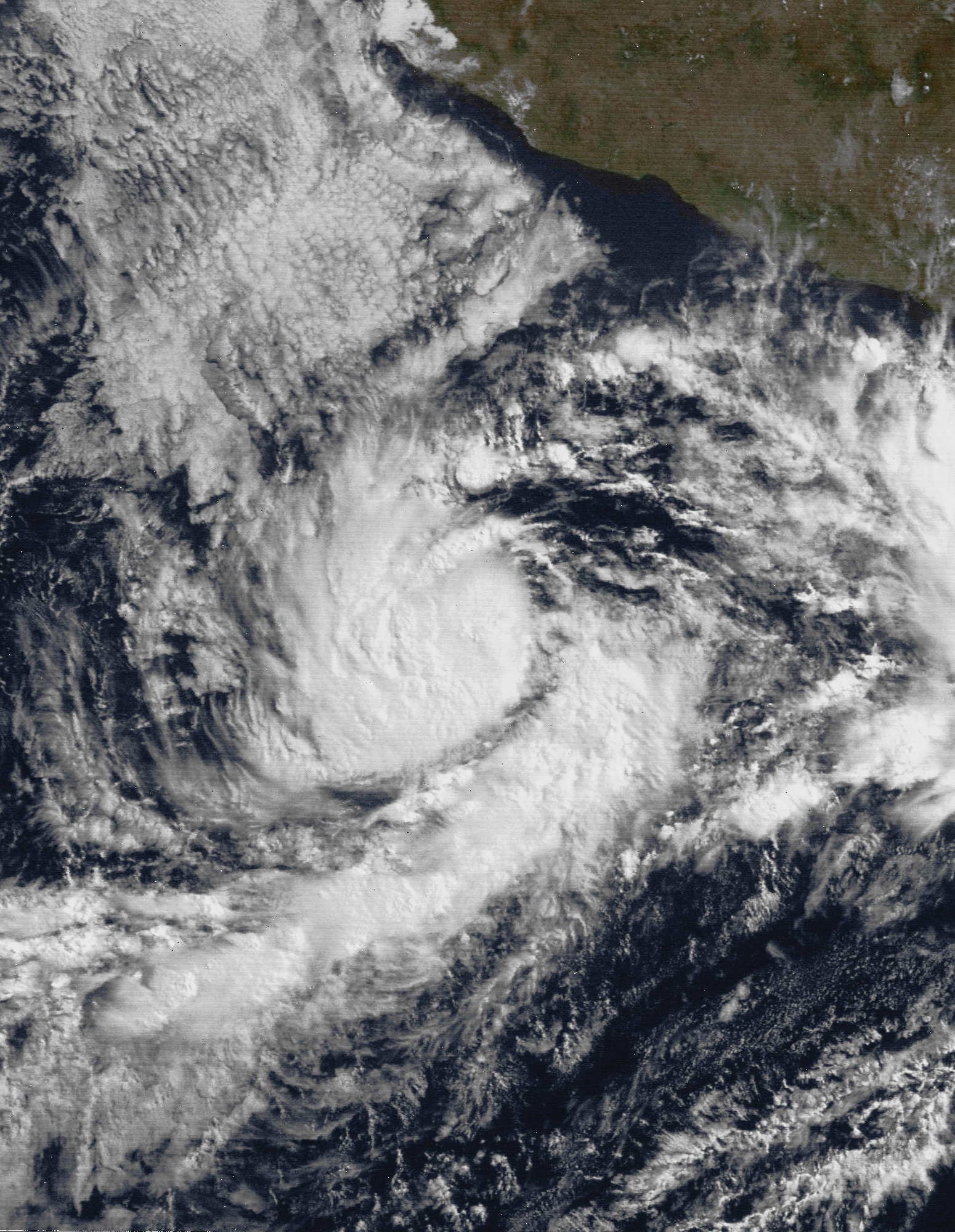
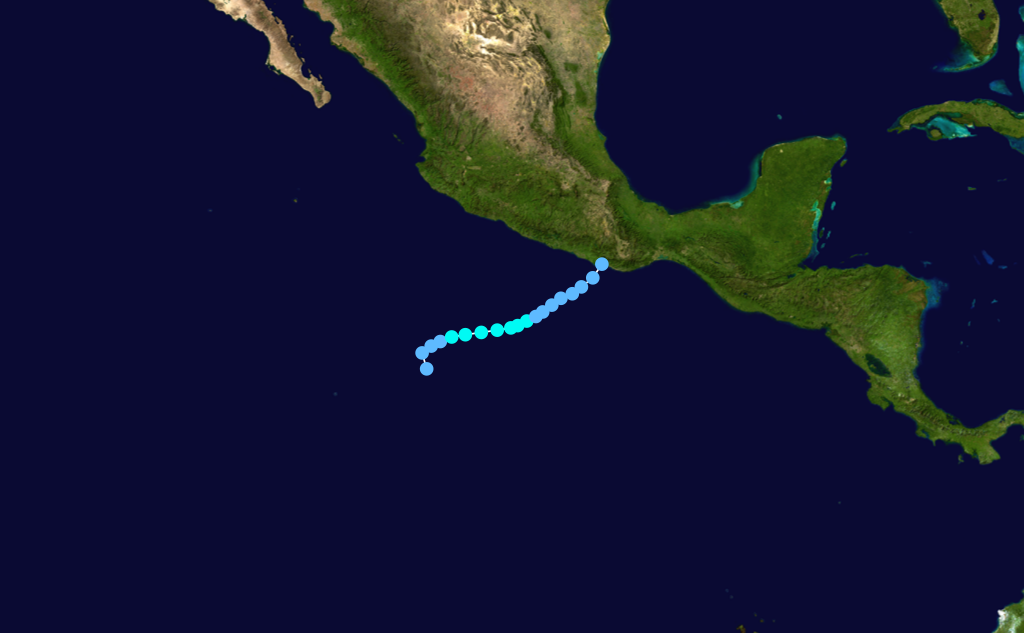
- Duration: May 30 – June 4
- Peak intensity: 45 mph (75 km/h) (1-min);

On May 30, an area of intense shower and thunderstorm activity located 270 mi (430 km) to the south of the Mexican coastline intensified into a tropical depression. Drifting towards the north and then east-northeast around an area of high pressure centered off the southern coast of Mexico, the depression began to strengthen over 84 °F (29 °C) water. Twelve hours after formation, the depression strengthened into Tropical Storm Adrian. Reaching a peak intensity of 45 mph (75 km/h), Adrian began to move over slightly cooler ocean temperatures of 81 °F (27 °C) and subsequently began to weaken. After being downgraded to a tropical depression by June 2, data from two cargo ships, the Androemda and Santa Maria, were helpful in locating Adrian's center of circulation as it moved towards the Mexican coastline. On June 4, the system made landfall 240 mi (390 km) east-southeast of Acapulco; however, no damage associated with the tropical cyclone was reported, and Adrian dissipated later that same day.

=== Hurricane Beatriz ===
- Category 1 hurricane (SSHWS)
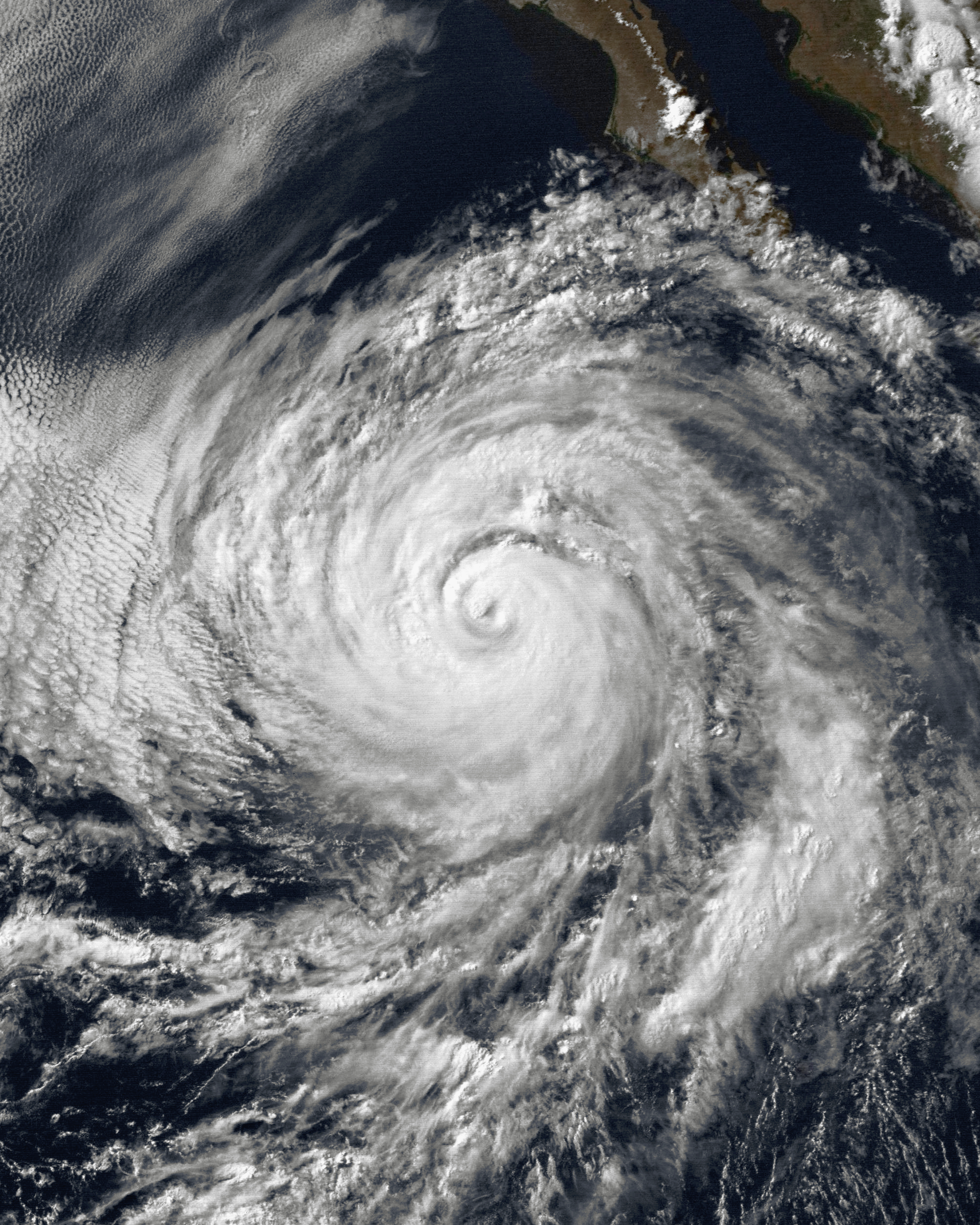
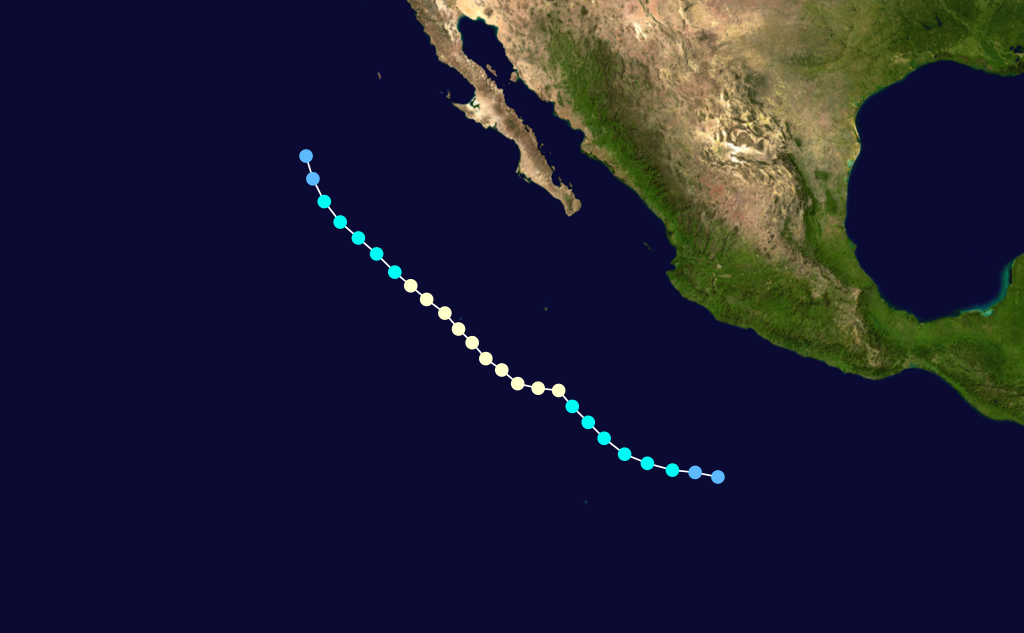
- Duration: June 28 – July 4
- Peak intensity: 85 mph (140 km/h) (1-min);

On June 28, the season's second tropical depression formed approximately 400 mi (640 km) east of Clipperton Island. Moving quickly towards the west over warm sea-surface temperatures, the depression strengthened into Tropical Storm Beatriz just twelve hours after formation. Embedded within an area of favorable atmospheric conditions, Beatriz attained hurricane status at 1800 UTC on June 30, and intensified further to attain its first brief peak at 85 mph (137 km/h) by early on June 1. Fluctuating in intensity, Hurricane Beatriz attained its peak intensity for a second time on June 2, only to enter an area of higher wind shear and cooler sea-surface temperatures. Far away from land, Beatriz was downgraded to a tropical storm on June 3, and then further into a tropical depression the following day. The tropical cyclone dissipated on July 4 while located several hundred miles to the west of Baja California Sur.

Since Beatriz briefly posed a threat to Mexico and California, the Hurricane Hunters were put on standby, but no flights were made into the storm. The system did produce wave heights as high as 4 ft (1.2 m) to Southern California; however, impact from the storm was less than anticipated.

=== Tropical Storm Calvin ===
- Tropical storm (SSHWS)
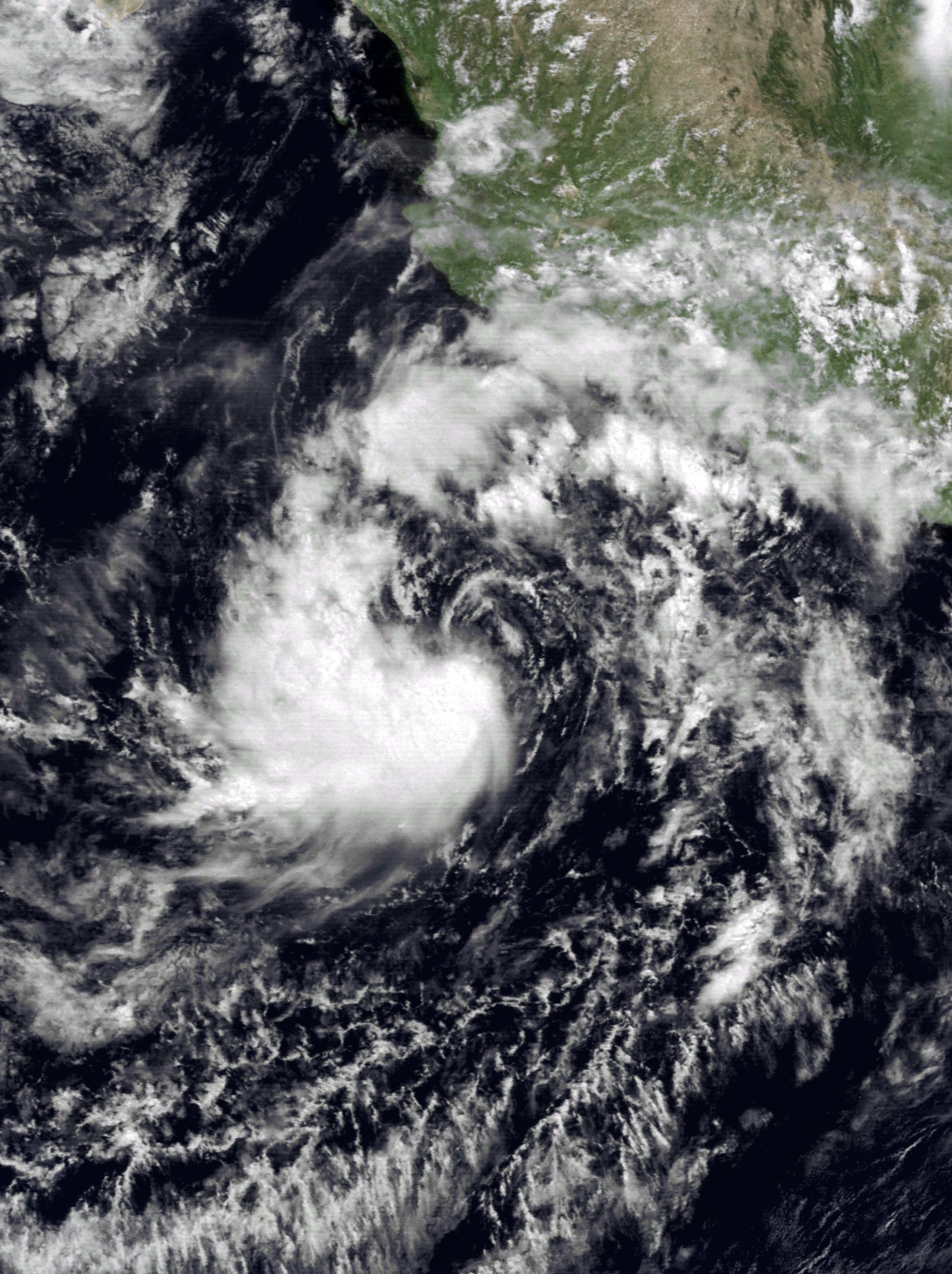
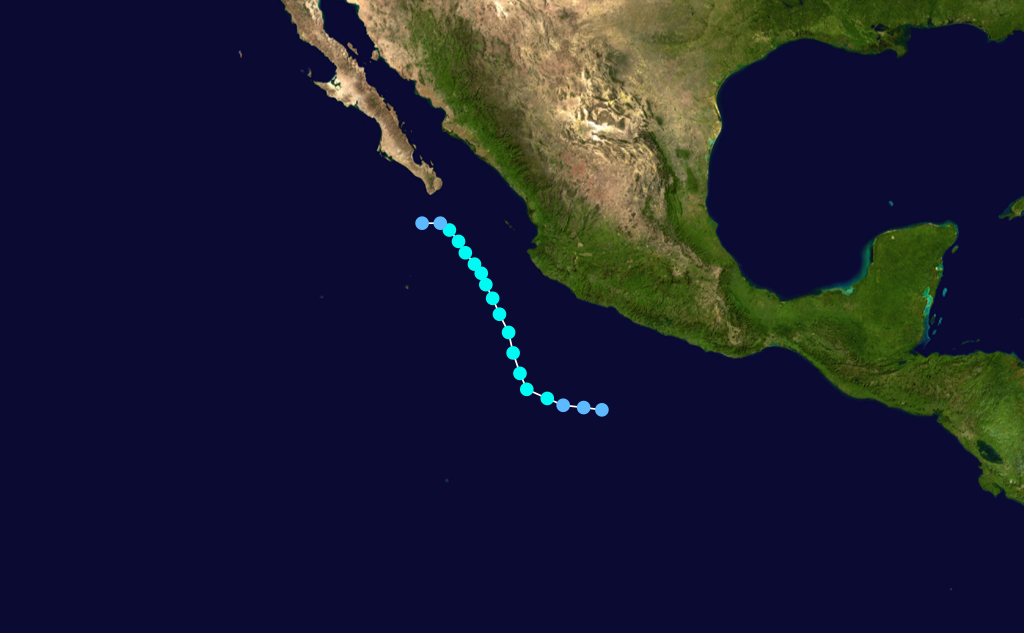
- Duration: July 4 – July 9
- Peak intensity: 50 mph (85 km/h) (1-min);

An area of disturbed weather located several hundred miles to the south of Acapulco organized into a tropical depression on July 4. Moving towards the west-northwest over warm sea-surface temperatures, the depression intensified into a tropical storm on July 5, receiving the name Calvin. Reaching a peak intensity of 50 mph (85 km/h) later that day, Calvin began to move north-northwest around the western periphery of a high pressure system located over extreme northern Mexico. Calvin then moved over cooler water and subsequently weakened to a minimal tropical storm. Located 98 mi (158 km) south-southeast of Cabo San Lucas on July 8, Calvin further weakened to a tropical depression and turned to the west. The system dissipated the following day. As a dying system, Calvin produced high clouds over California and Arizona.

=== Hurricane Dora ===
- Category 1 hurricane (SSHWS)
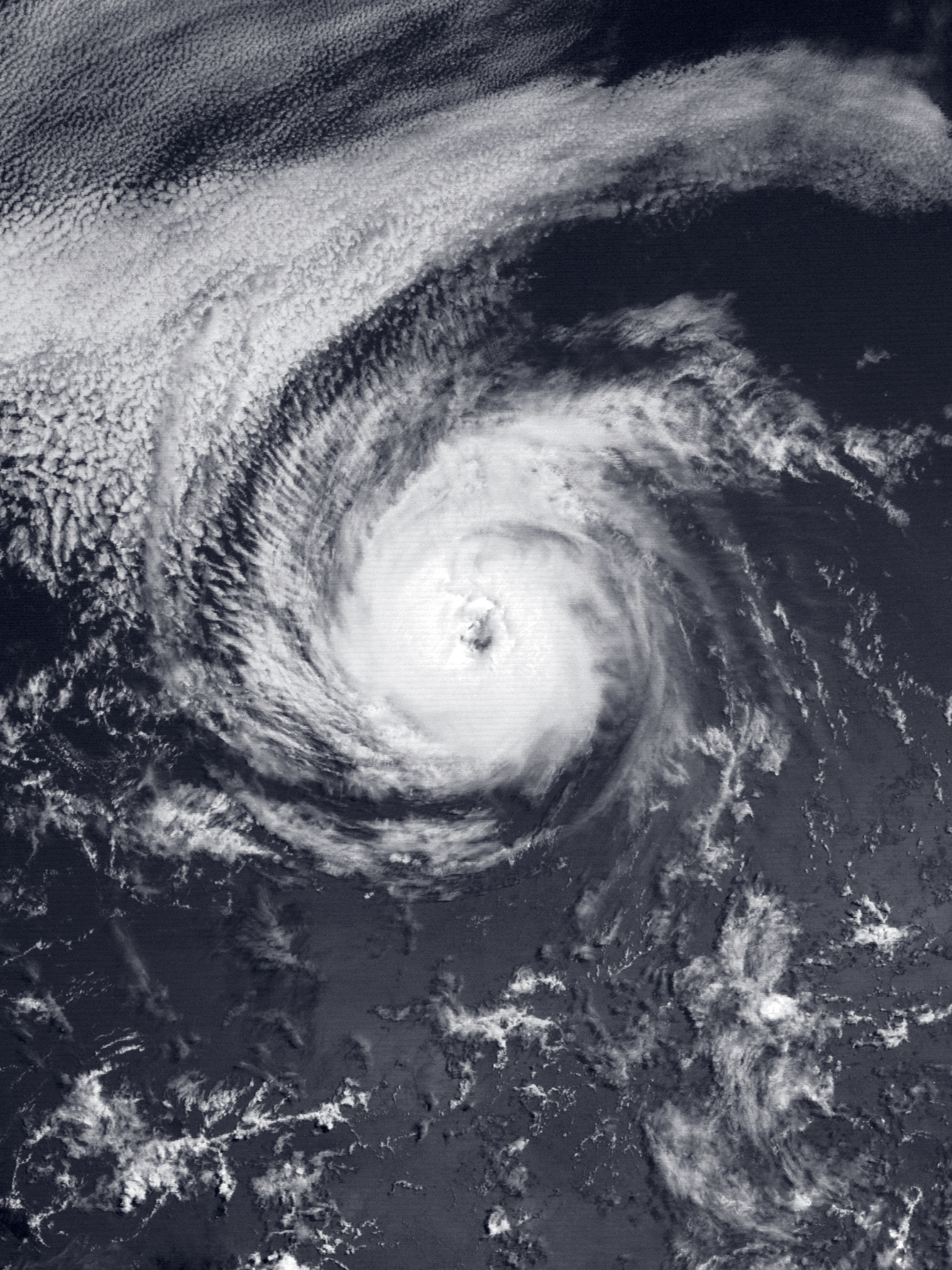
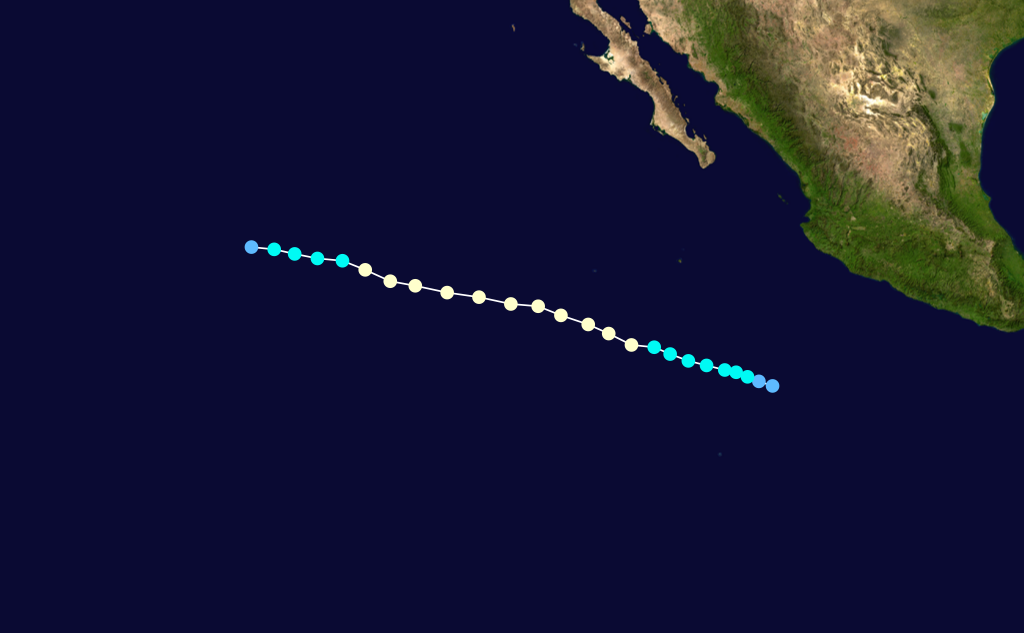
- Duration: July 10 – July 16
- Peak intensity: 90 mph (150 km/h) (1-min); 979 mbar (hPa)

Based on satellite imagery and data from a nearby ship, Yamazuru, a tropical depression formed far away from land on July 10. Passing 254 mi (409 km) north of Clipperton Island, the depression began to strengthen under favorable atmospheric conditions, and was designated Tropical Storm Dora twelve hours after formation. Moving towards the west-northwest, Dora attained hurricane status on July 13; subsequently, the ship Amestelmolen reported seas of 30 ft (9.1 m), a minimum barometric pressure of 981 mbar (29.0 inHg), and 79 mph (127 km/h) winds as it passed 29 mi (47 km) north of the storm's center. As Dora reached its peak intensity of 90 mph (150 km/h) on July 14, a well-defined eye became apparent on satellite imagery, and the storm turned more towards the west. Cooler ocean temperatures below 74 °F (23 °C) subsequently caused the hurricane to weaken, and it was downgraded to a tropical storm on July 15. The storm's structure further deteriorated the following day, and Dora dissipated over 1,000 mi (1,600 km) southwest of Cabo San Lucas.

=== Tropical Storm Eugene ===
- Tropical storm (SSHWS)
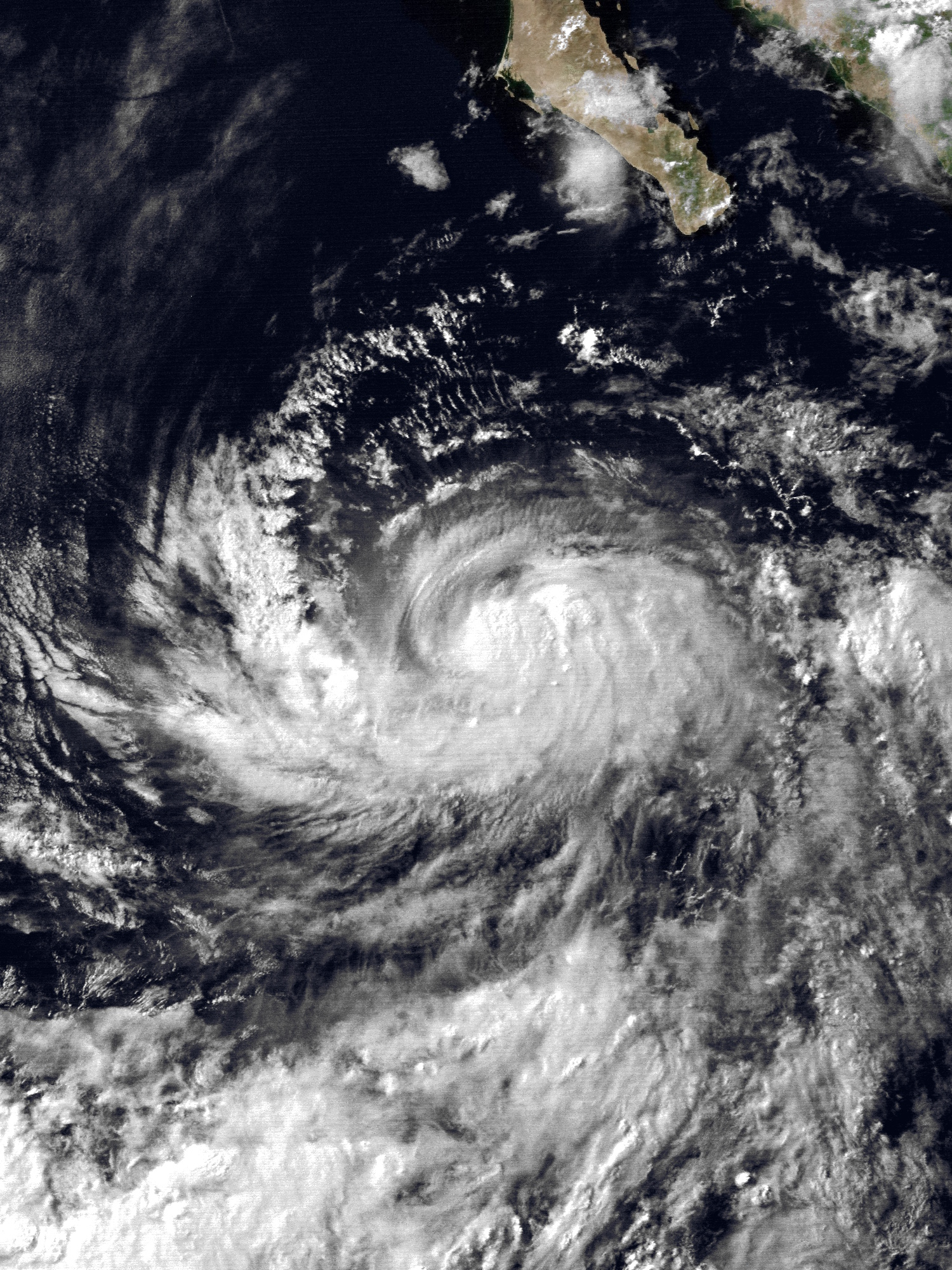
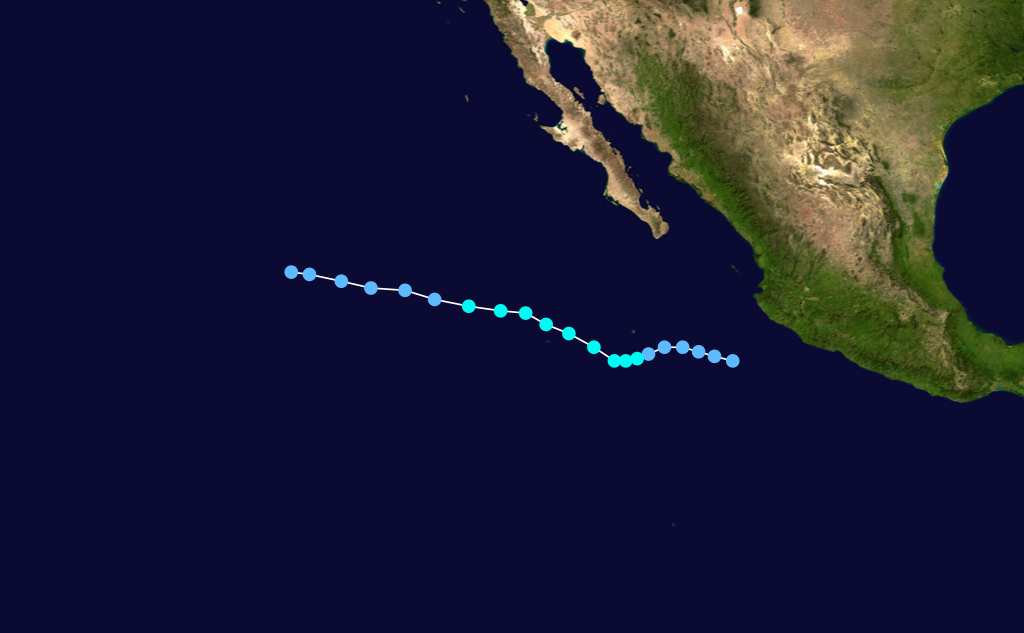
- Duration: July 16 – July 21
- Peak intensity: 50 mph (85 km/h) (1-min);

Following Dora's dissipation, another tropical depression formed 300 mi (480 km) west of the Mexican coastline. While retaining its intensity, the depression moved west-northwest before bending towards the southwest as it intensified into Tropical Storm Eugene on July 18. Above exceptionally warm sea surface temperatures of 85 °F (29 °C), Eugene slowly intensified. After passing 83 mi (134 km) south of Socorro Island, the storm accelerated west-northwest, reaching a peak intensity of 50 mph (80 km/h) early on June 19. Shortly thereafter, the system began to meander over cooler ocean temperatures, and weakened to a tropical depression on July 20. After changing little in intensity for nearly 24 hours, Eugene dissipated on July 21 while located 700 mi (1,100 km) west of the Baja California Peninsula, over water temperatures of 73 °F (23 °C). There were no reports of any effects attributed to the storm.

=== Hurricane Fernanda ===
- Category 2 hurricane (SSHWS)
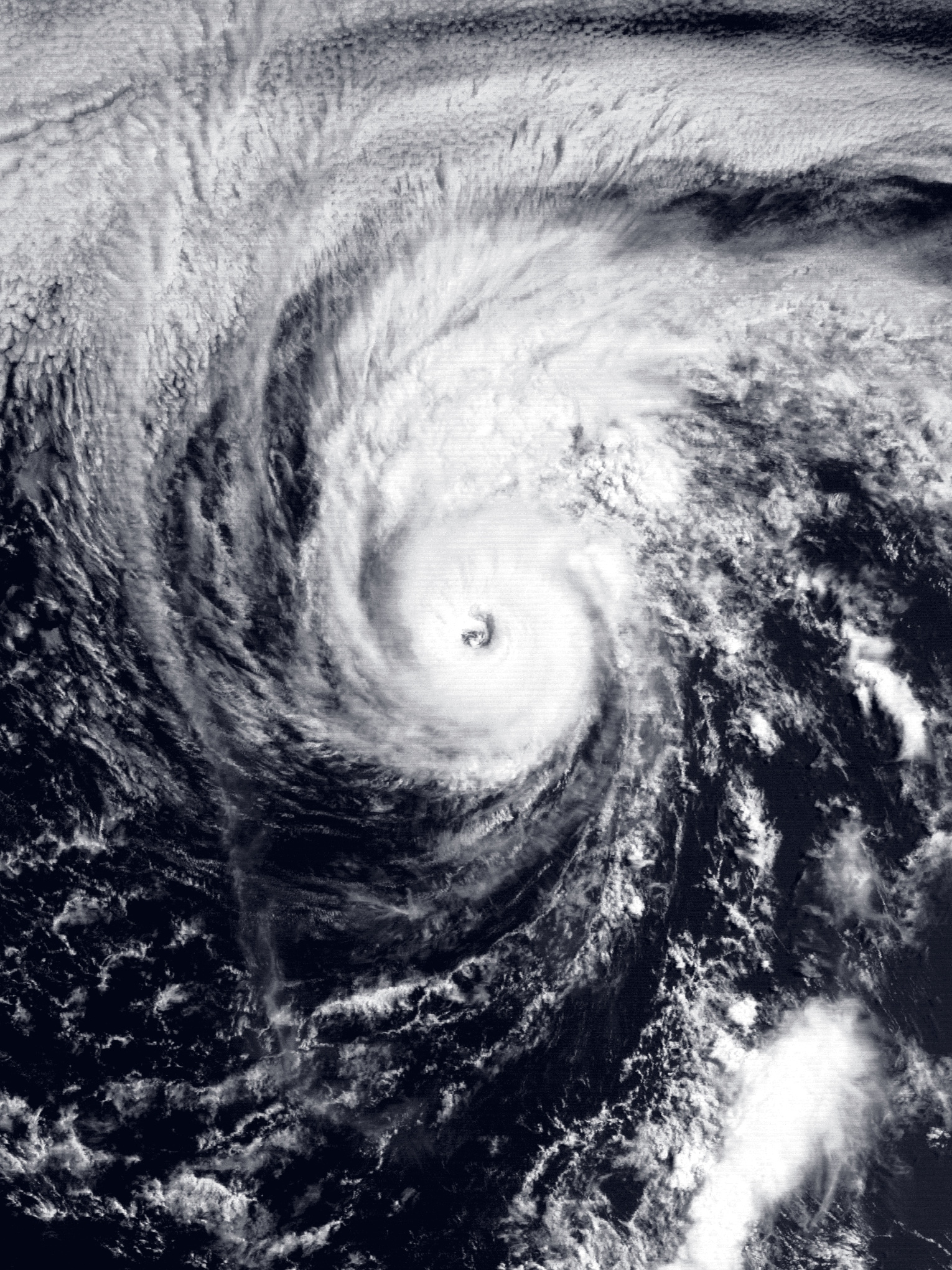
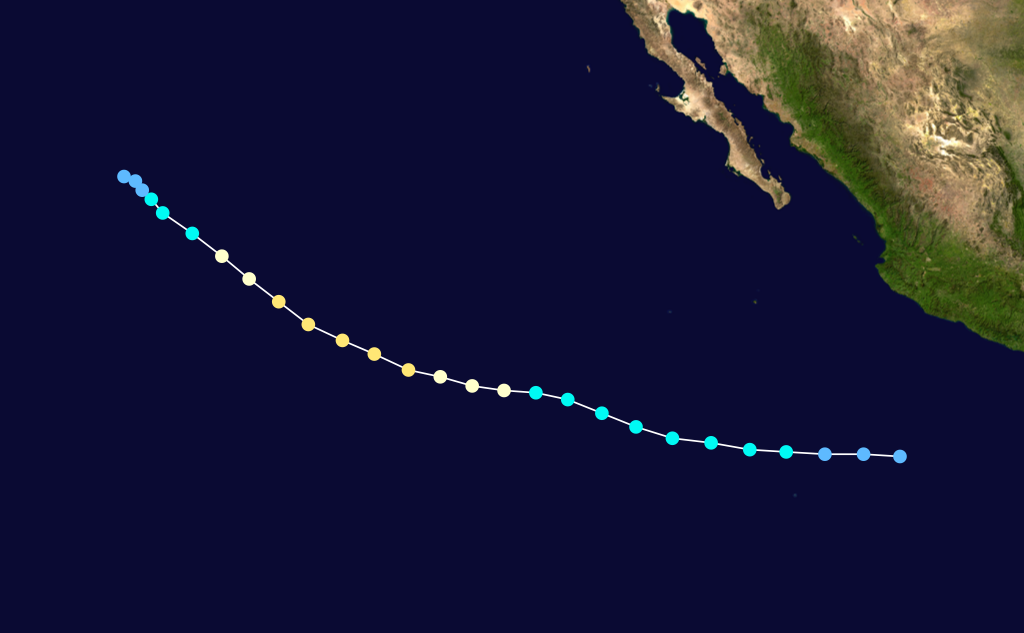
- Duration: August 6 – August 13
- Peak intensity: 105 mph (165 km/h) (1-min);

Fernanda originated from an area of showers and thunderstorms that gained sufficient organization to be designated a tropical depression on August 6. Moving rapidly towards the west, the system passed 126 mi (203 km) north of Clipperton Island. Above warm ocean temperatures, the depression strengthened to become a tropical storm twenty-one hours after formation, and after briefly turning towards the west-northwest, Fernanda attained hurricane status on August 9. A well-defined eye associated with the hurricane became visible, and the system reached its peak intensity as a 105 mph (165 km/h) Category 2 hurricane on the Saffir–Simpson Hurricane Scale on August 10. Turning towards the northwest, Fernanda began to enter an area of cooler ocean temperatures and higher wind shear, subsequently weakening. On August 11, Fernanda was downgraded to a Category 1 hurricane, and then further to a tropical storm later that evening. By midday the following day, Fernanda had become a tropical depression, and dissipated early on August 13.

=== Hurricane Greg ===
- Category 1 hurricane (SSHWS)
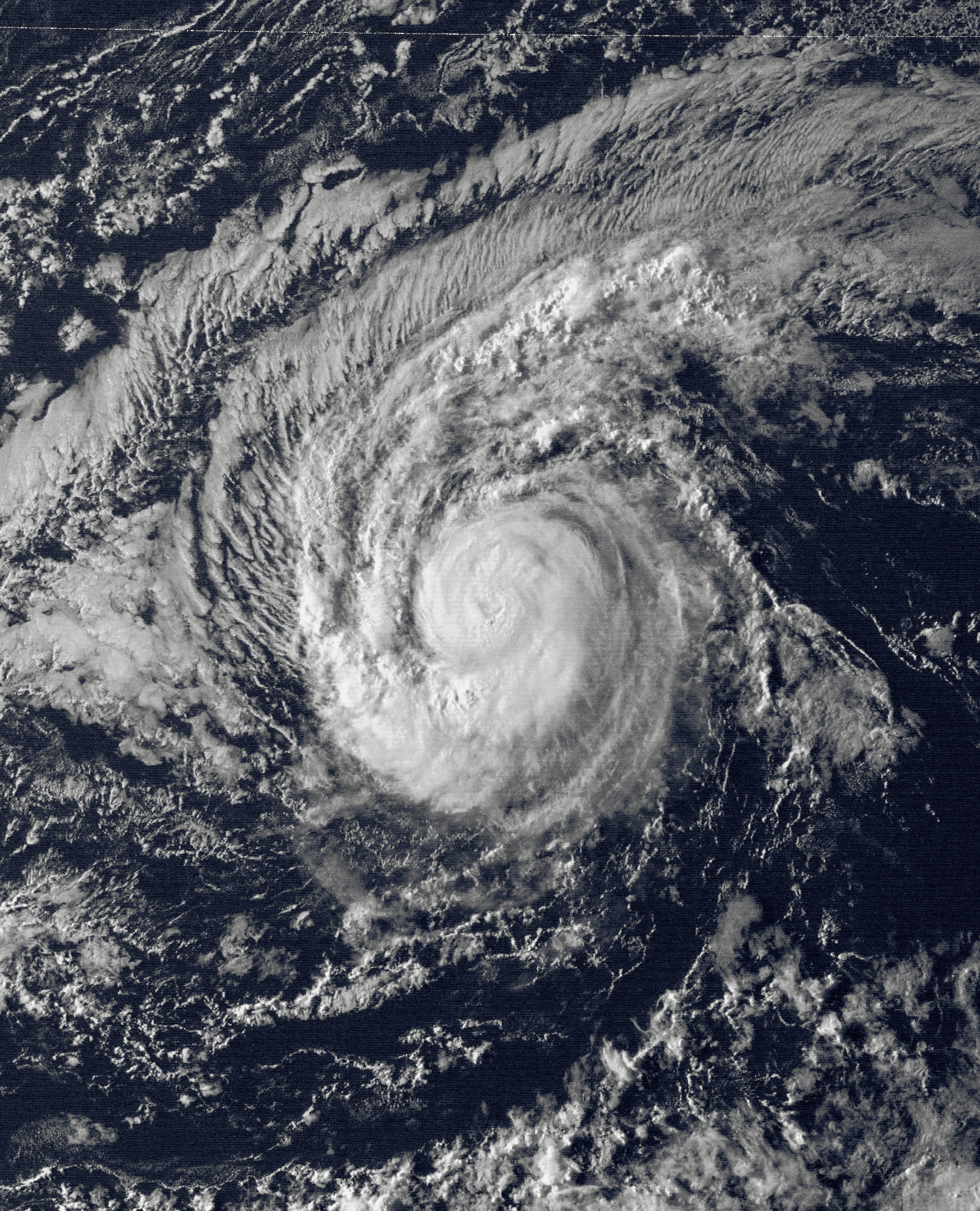
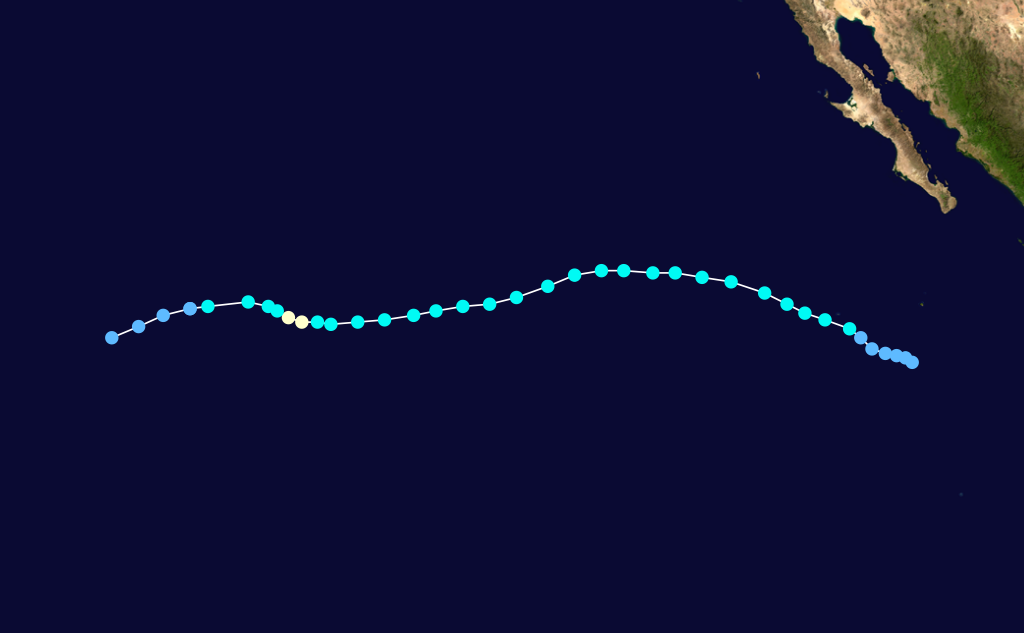
- Duration: August 13 – August 22
- Peak intensity: 75 mph (120 km/h) (1-min);

An area of intense thunderstorm activity left the southern coast of Mexico in mid-August. About 184 mi (296 km) south of Socorro Island, it formed on August 13. Over warm sea surface temperatures, the depression steadily intensified; it was upgraded to Tropical Storm Greg at 1800 UTC. As the storm was moving on the southwest periphery of an area of high pressure, it curved west-northwest. Meanwhile, the storm passed 34 mi (55 km) south of Clarion Island at 2100 UTC on August 14. After turning toward the west, the storm's motion slowed. After maintaining its intensity while still a minimal tropical storm, Greg turned to the west-southwest for a day, only to resume its westerly course. As its speed increased a little, Greg gradually strengthened. Based on data from the ship Chapa, Greg was upgraded into a hurricane early on August 20. However, increased wind shear caused the storm to rapidly weaken back into a tropical storm. At this time, the tropical storm was located over 78 °F (26 °C) water. Shortly thereafter, Greg moved into the Central Pacific Hurricane Center (CPHC)'s area of responsibility. It continued to weaken, and was only a minimal tropical storm by the afternoon of August 21. Although Greg weakened into a depression, it maintained a well-defined center of circulation for an additional 24 hours until dissipating at 1800 UTC on August 22 over 600 mi (970 km) east-northeast of Hawaii.

=== Hurricane Hilary ===
- Category 1 hurricane (SSHWS)
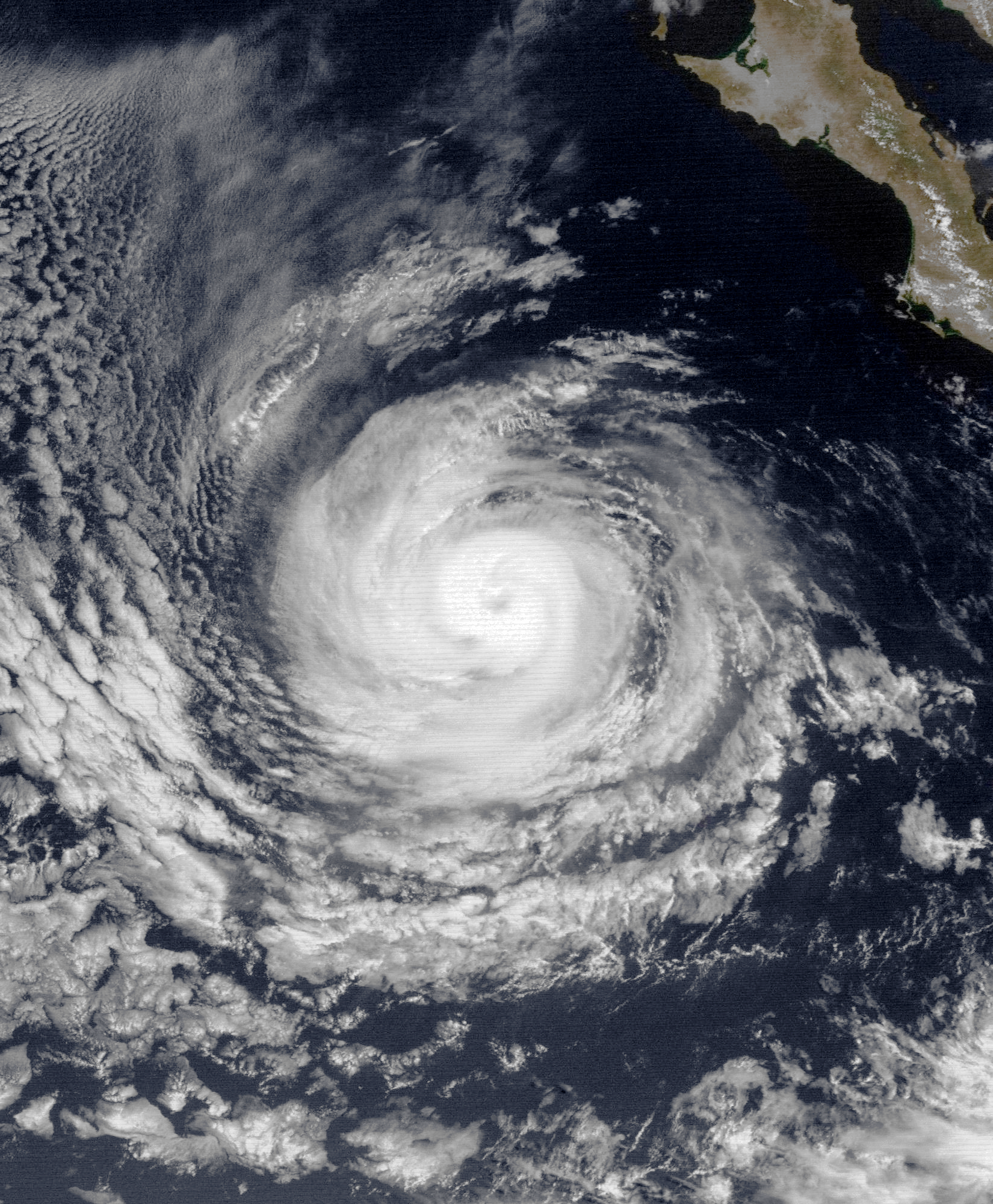
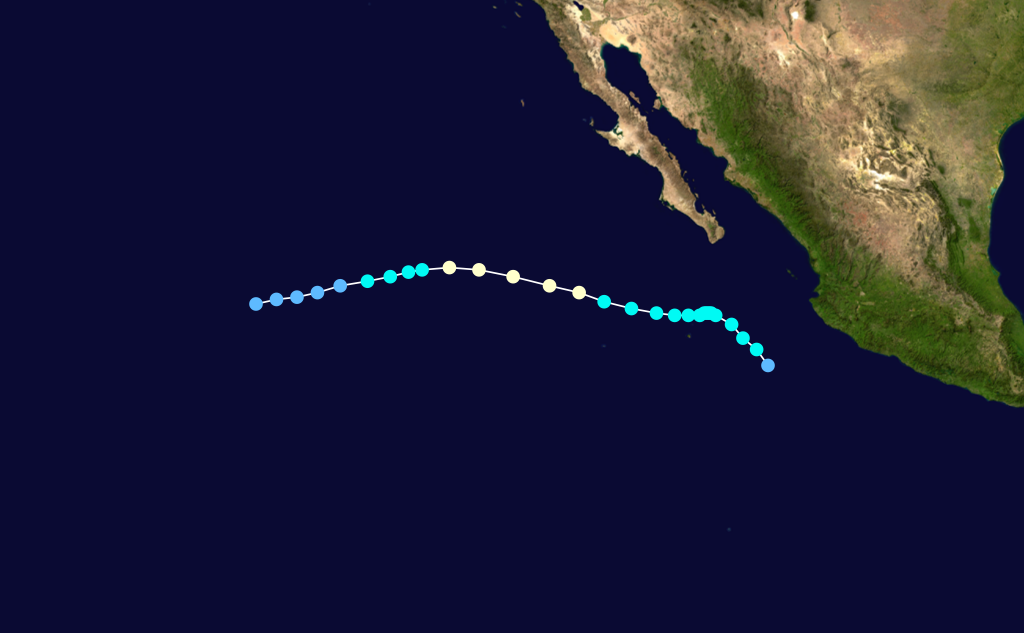
- Duration: August 21 – August 28
- Peak intensity: 85 mph (140 km/h) (1-min);

Based on a report from a cargo ship, the Eastern Pacific Hurricane Center upgraded a tropical disturbance into a tropical depression roughly 400 mi (640 km) west of the Mexican coast at 2105 UTC on August 21. Four hours later, the system strengthened into Tropical Storm Hilary. After turning towards the west, it passed about 50 mi (80 km) south of Socorro Island. Even though Hilary developed a well-defined eye late on August 23, the cyclone was not upgraded into a hurricane until the next afternoon. Accelerating, Hilary reached its peak strength of 85 mph (140 km/h) while located 250 miles (400 km) west of Cabo San Lucas. Moving west, Hilary began to weaken over 84 °F (29 °C) water. Late on August 28, nearly 24 hours following Hilary's downgrade into a tropical depression, the tropical cyclone dissipated far from land.

=== Tropical Storm Irwin ===
- Tropical storm (SSHWS)
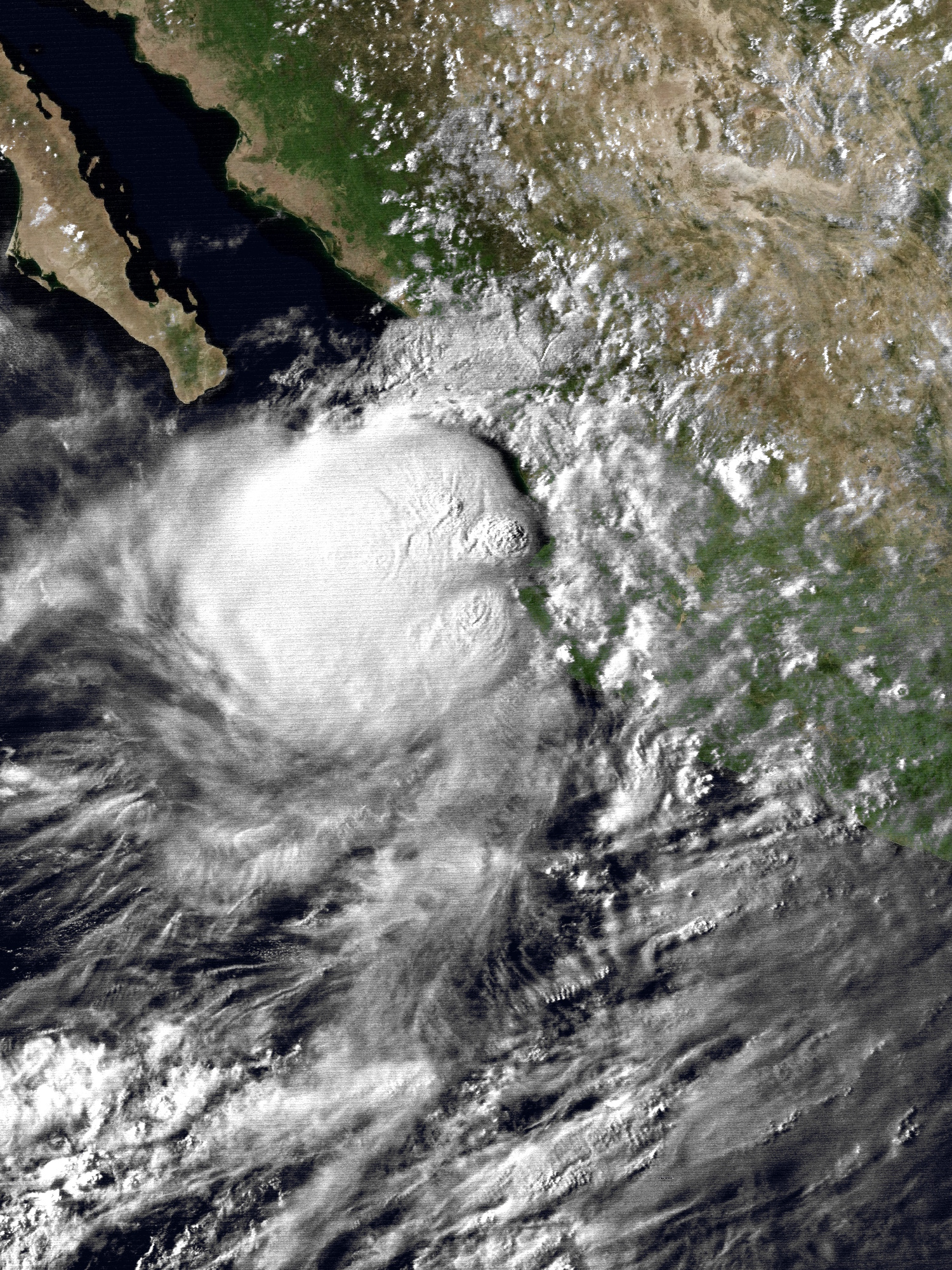
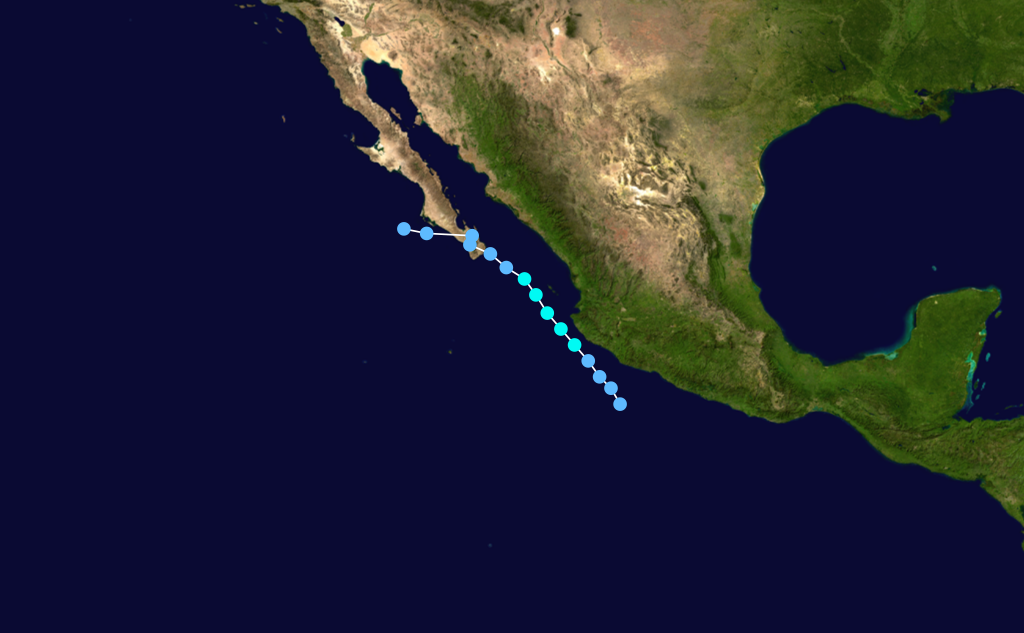
- Duration: August 27 – August 31
- Peak intensity: 50 mph (85 km/h) (1-min);

A tropical depression formed 155 mi (249 km) west of Acapulco on August 27. Over 85 °F (29 °C) water, the depression intensified into Tropical Storm Irwin the next day. By August 25, Tropical Storm Irwin had peaked in intensity as a moderate tropical storm, then weakened as it moved over 83 °F (28 °C) sea-surface temperatures. Less than 100 mi (160 km) southeast of Baja California, Irwin was downgraded into a depression. Turning west-northwest, Irwin made landfall about 50 mi (80 km) south of La Paz on August 30. After moving offshore the next day, Irwin dissipated. No damage was reported.

=== Hurricane Jova ===
- Category 1 hurricane (SSHWS)
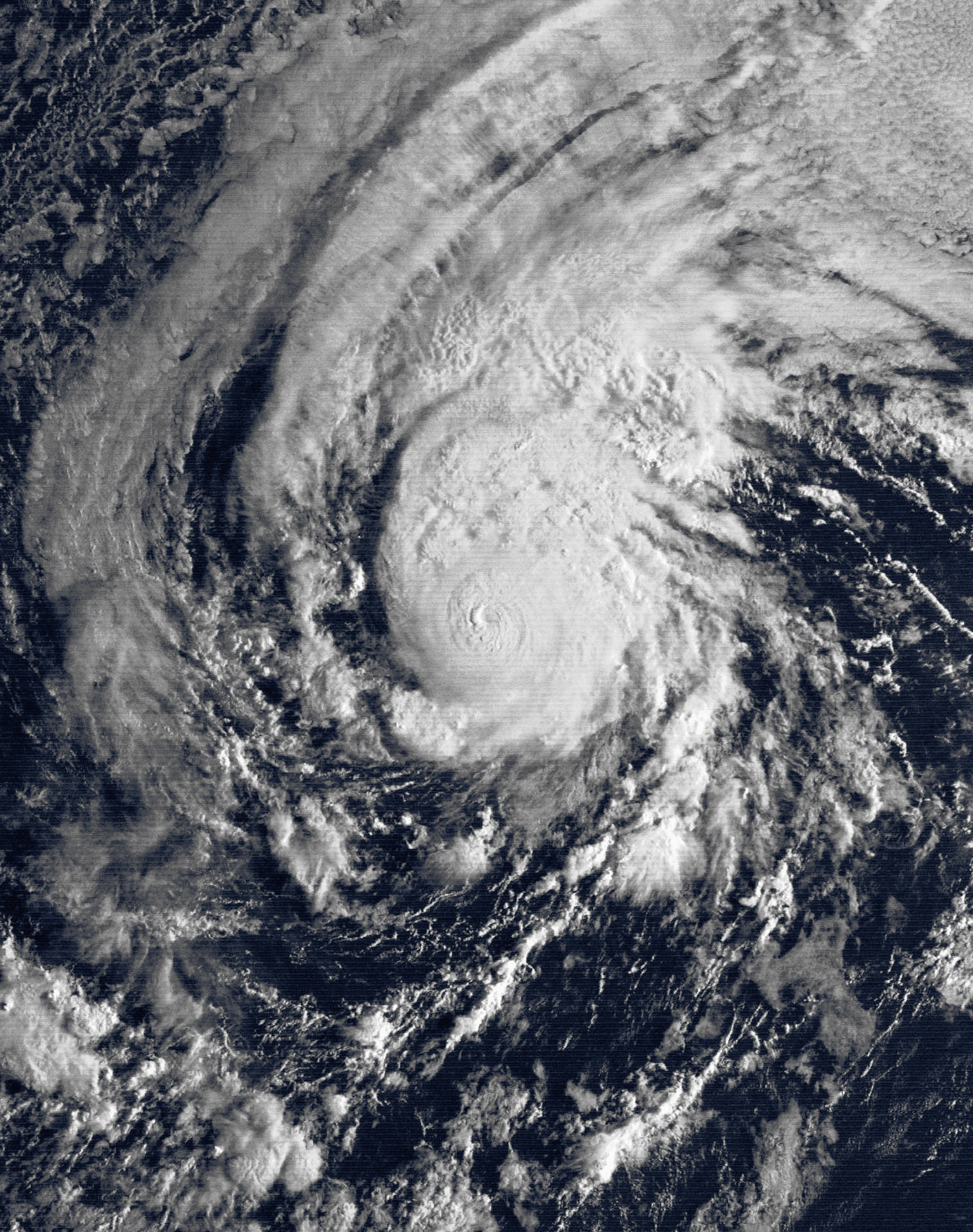
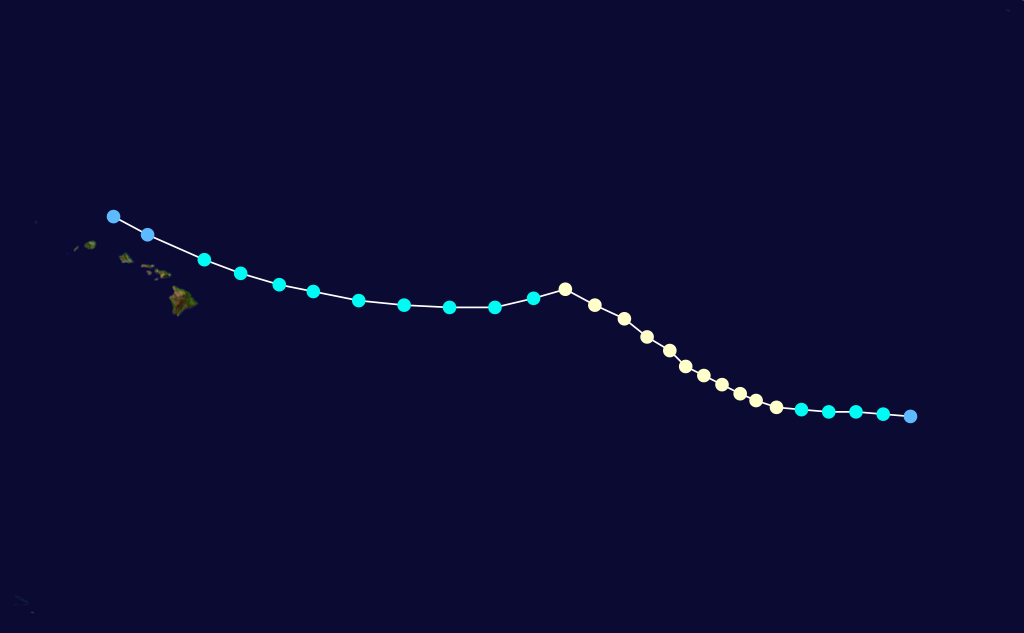
- Duration: September 14 – September 21
- Peak intensity: 85 mph (140 km/h) (1-min);

Following two weeks of inactivity, a tropical depression formed at 1200 UTC September 14 while located in the middle of the Eastern Pacific. Above very warm ocean temperatures, the depression was upgraded into Tropical Storm Jova six hours later. Jova rapidly intensified, and developed an eye late on September 15. Early on September 17, Jova peaked as a mid-level Category 1 hurricane. After briefly turning to the west-southwest, Jova turned back towards the west while weakened into a tropical storm. On September 19, the cyclone turned west-northwest, and dissipated about 100 miles (160 km) north of Hawaii on September 21. Due to its track just north of Hawaii and rapidly weakening in the Central Pacific, its only effect on the Hawaiian Islands was to disrupt the trade winds, leading to an increase in humidity.

=== Tropical Storm Knut ===
- Tropical storm (SSHWS)
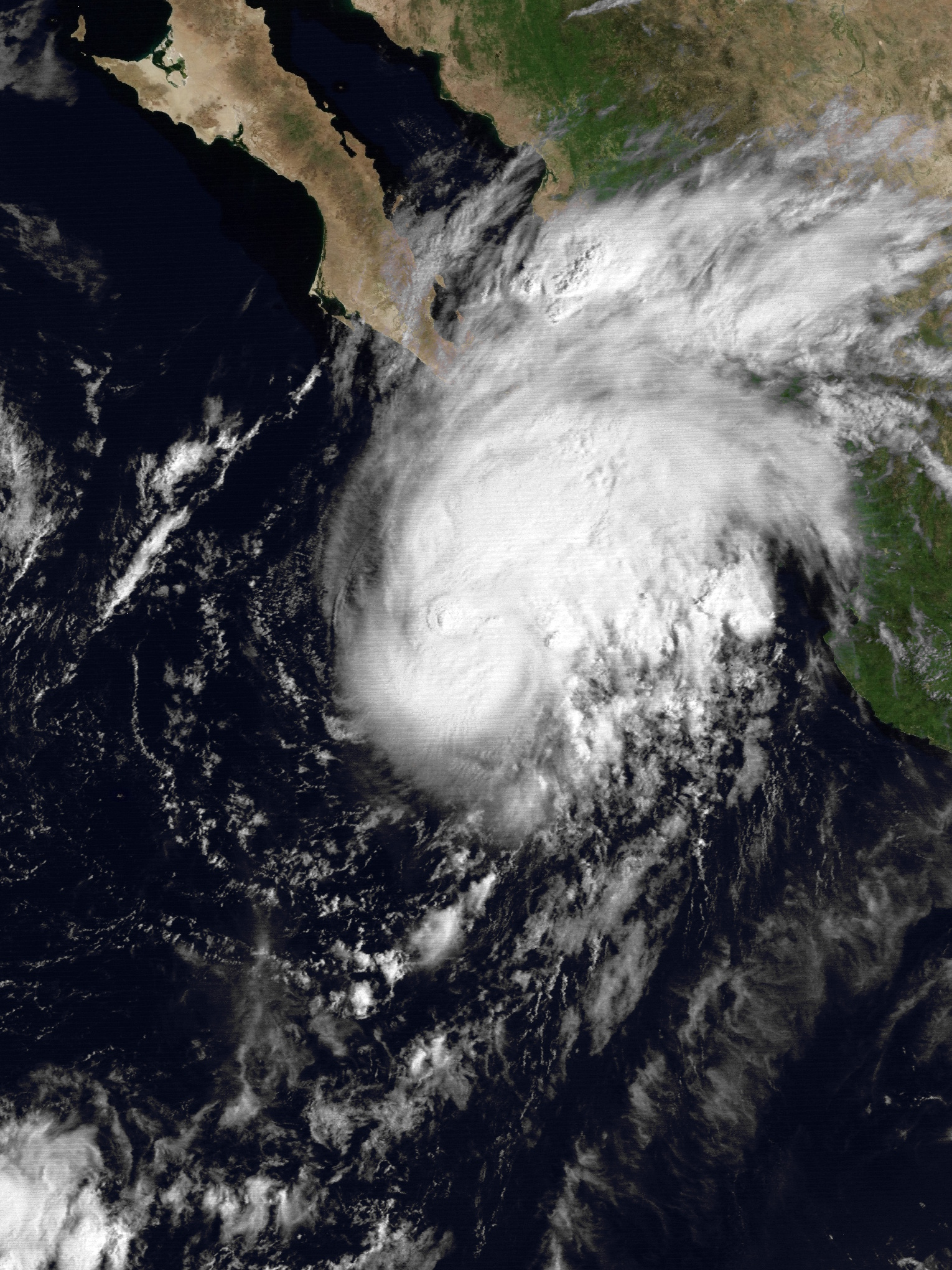
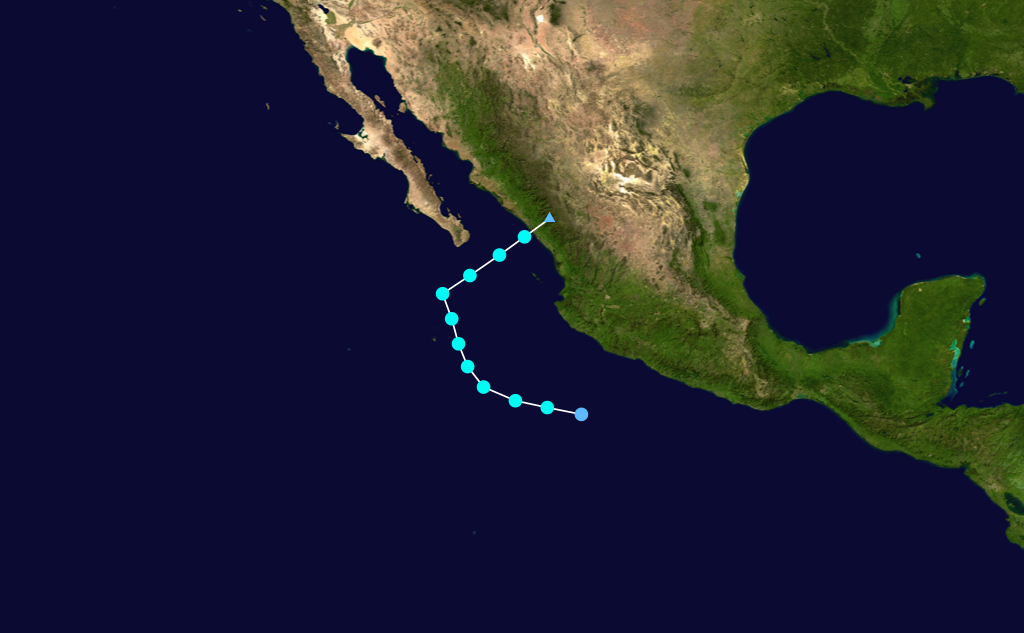
- Duration: September 19 – September 21
- Peak intensity: 65 mph (100 km/h) (1-min);

While Jova was weakening, a tropical disturbance formed within 300 mi (480 km) the Mexican coast. Moving west-northwest, a tropical depression formed on September 19, and became a tropical storm six hours later. Above 85 °F (29 °C) sea surface temperatures, Knut continued to intensify. After turning north, Tropical Storm Knut reached its peak strength of 65 mph (120 km/h). Between a high-pressure area and a weak upper-level trough, Knut turned sharply to the east. After passing 100 mi (160 km) south of the Baja California Peninsula, the tropical storm weakened over cooler water. Knut dissipated as it made landfall in Mexico, at 1330 UTC on September 21. No damage was reported.

=== Tropical Storm Lidia ===
- Tropical storm (SSHWS)
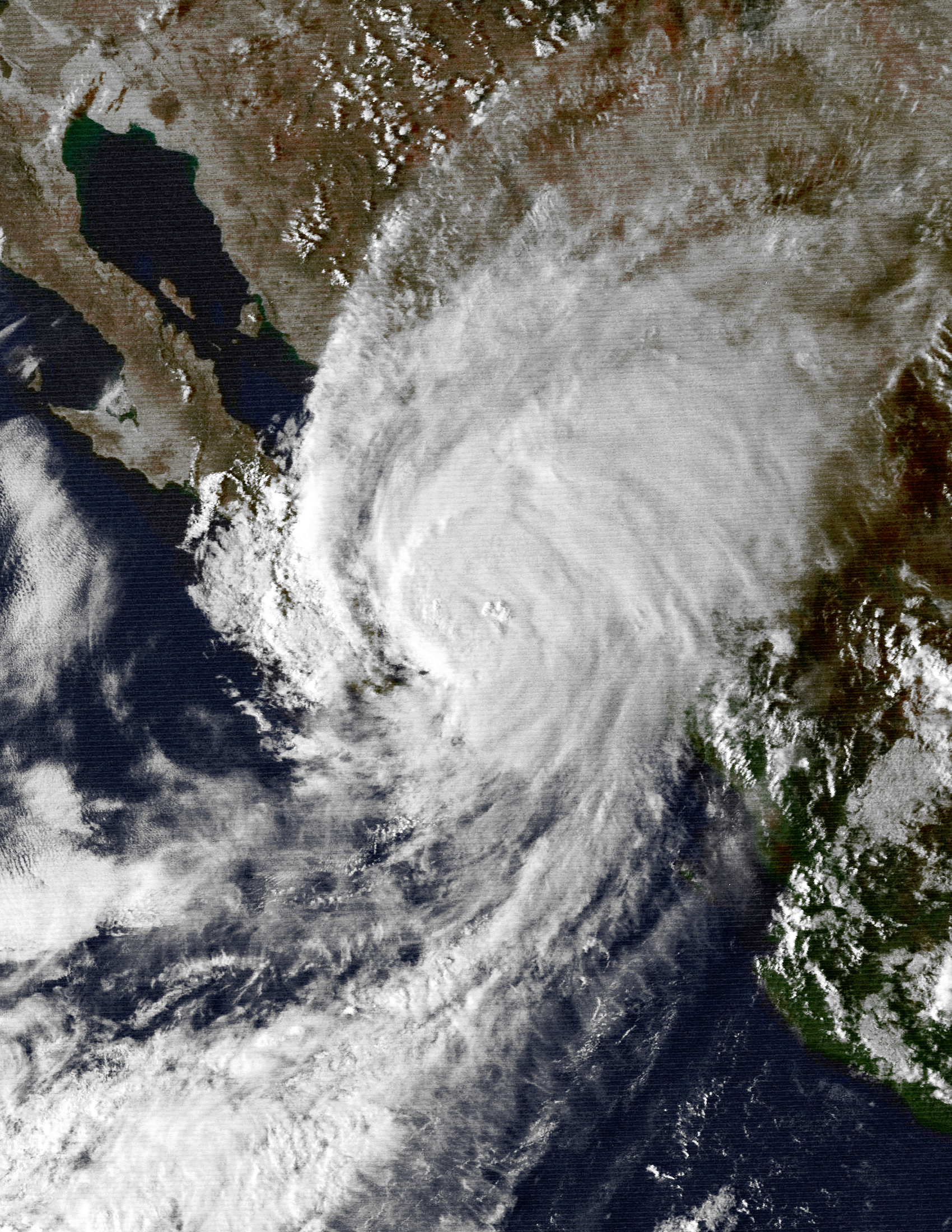
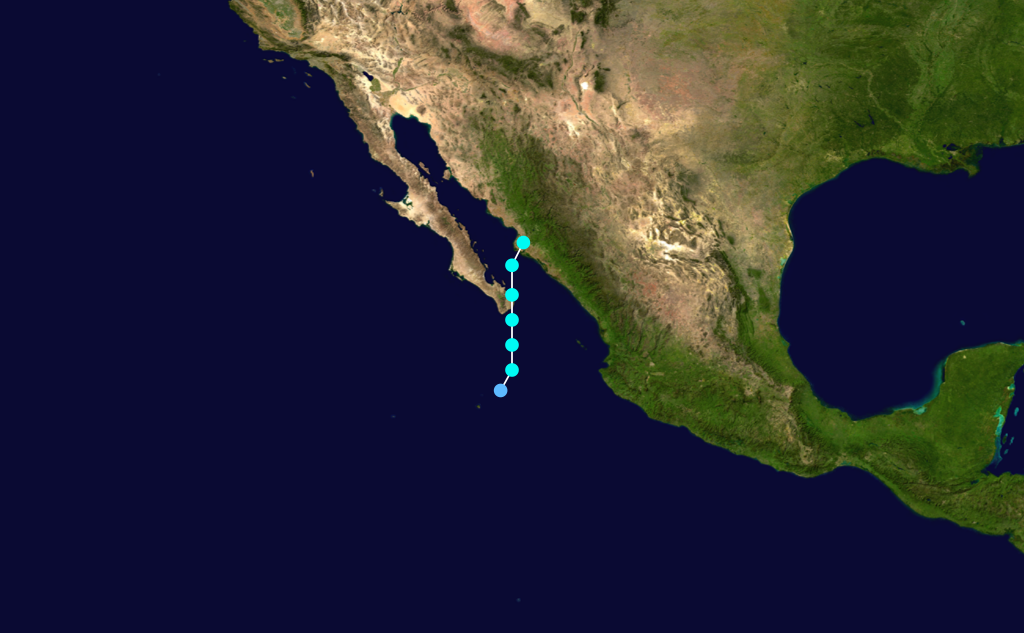
- Duration: October 6 – October 8
- Peak intensity: 50 mph (85 km/h) (1-min);

A tropical depression formed on October 6 ahead of a front; the depression intensified into Tropical Storm Lidia on October 7. Lidia moved generally north, and reached its peak wind speed of 50 mph (85 km/h). Despite encountering warm ocean temperatures, Lidia slowly weakened as it moved towards southern Baja California Peninsula. The tropical cyclone passed over the southern tip of the Baja California Peninsula on 1700 UTC October 7; at the time of the landfall Lidia was located about 65 mi (105 km) northwest of Cabo San Lucas. Two hours later, Lidia entered the Gulf of California, and turned to the northeast. Lidia made landfall on the shores of Sinaloa just south of Los Mochis on October 8, with winds of 45 mph (75 km/h). The remnants of Lidia continued their northeast track, ultimately emerging into the Southern United States, bringing moisture to extreme southeastern Arizona.

Heavy rain caused flooding that cut off seven towns in Sinaloa from the outside world. It also contaminated the water supply in Culiacán, leaving many without clean drinking water. Almost a hundred villages and two dams were flooded, The Rio Fuerte burst its banks and flooded sixty settlements. These rains sent water down a dry river bed, killing 40 people, mostly children. In one village, six soldiers died. In the northern part of Sinaloa, 42 were confirmed killed and 76 were missing. Around Los Mochis, four people were killed, where 800 houses were destroyed. In Culiacán, eleven people were killed. The total death toll from Tropical Storm Lidia was determined to exceed 73, which mostly occurred in rural areas. Losses to cattle, crops, and fishing vessels were more than $80 million (equivalent to $283.31 million in 2025). Due to the damage wrought by both Lidia and Norma, Sinaloa Governor Antonio Toledo Corro declared his state a disaster area.

=== Tropical Storm Max ===
- Tropical storm (SSHWS)
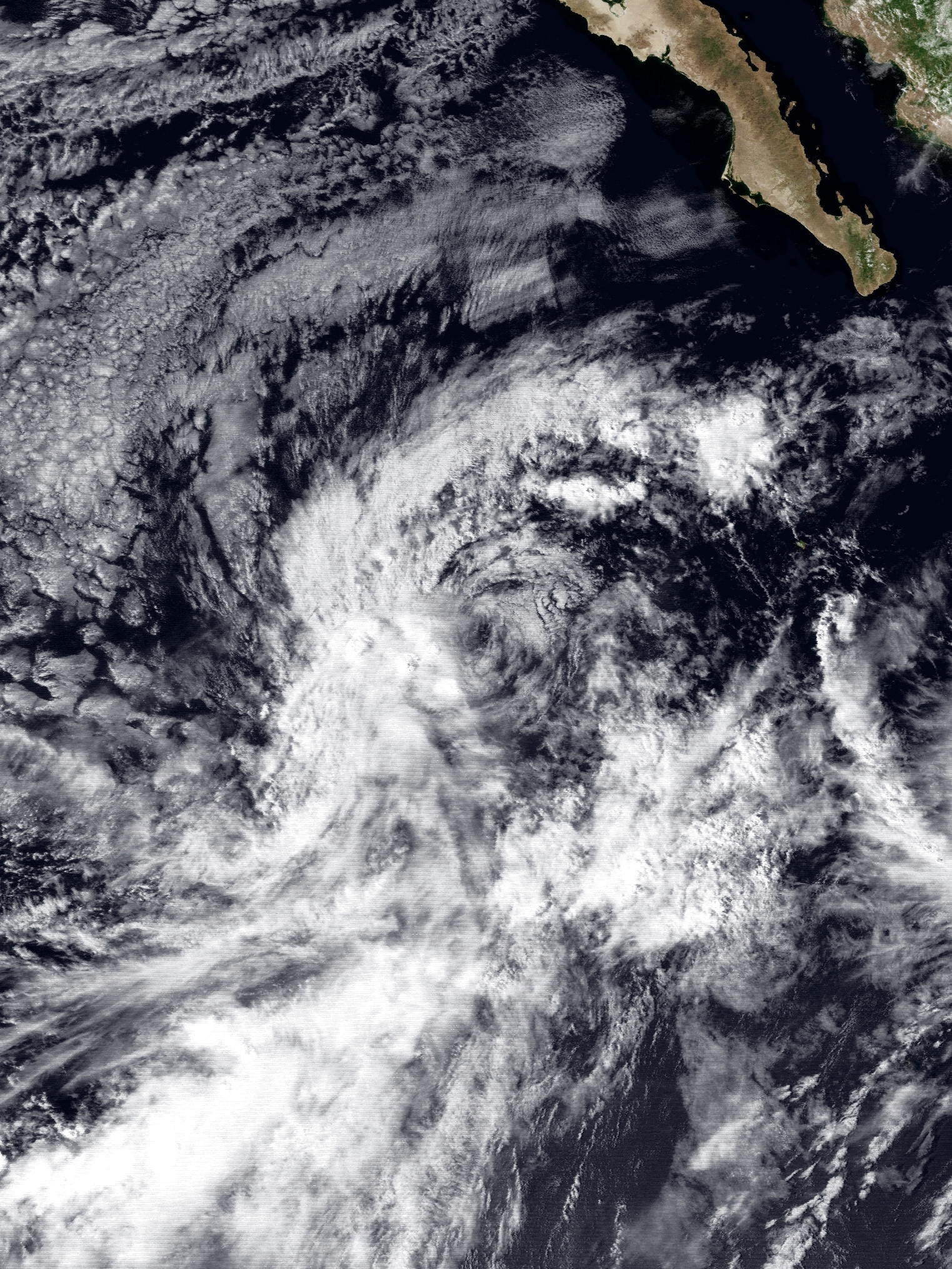
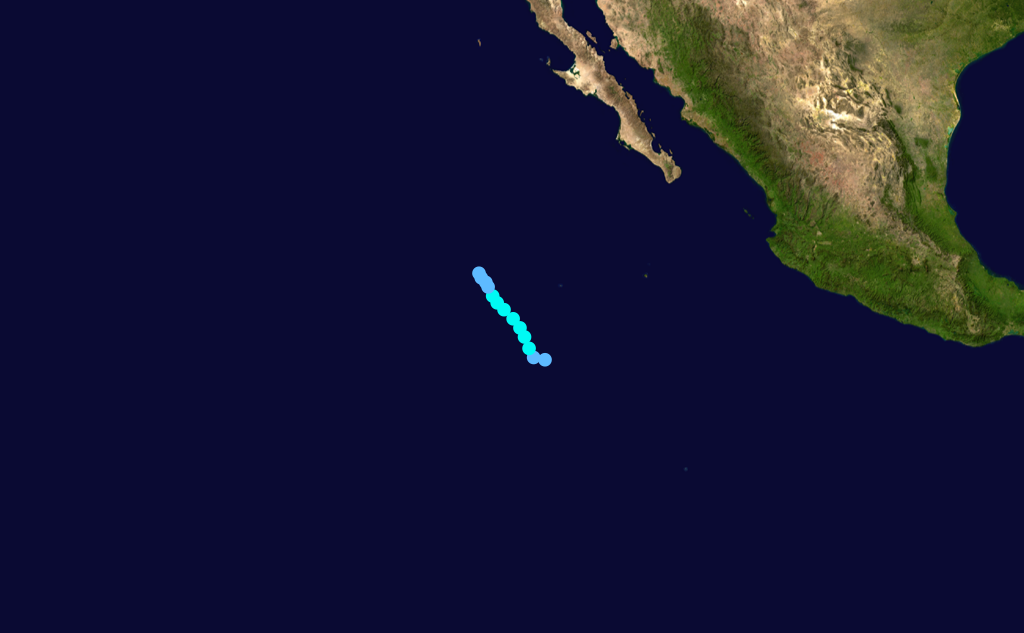
- Duration: October 7 – October 10
- Peak intensity: 50 mph (85 km/h) (1-min);

On October 7, a tropical depression developed several hundred miles to the south of the Mexican coastline. Under favorable environmental conditions, the depression began to organize, and became a tropical storm twelve hours after formation, receiving the name Max. Moving north-northwestward, Max reached a peak intensity of 50 mph (80 km/h) briefly on October 9 before the system began to move into an area with cooler ocean temperatures and stronger wind shear. Early on October 10, Max weakened to a tropical depression, and dissipated during the afternoon hours of the same day without any effects to land.

=== Hurricane Norma ===
- Category 3 hurricane (SSHWS)
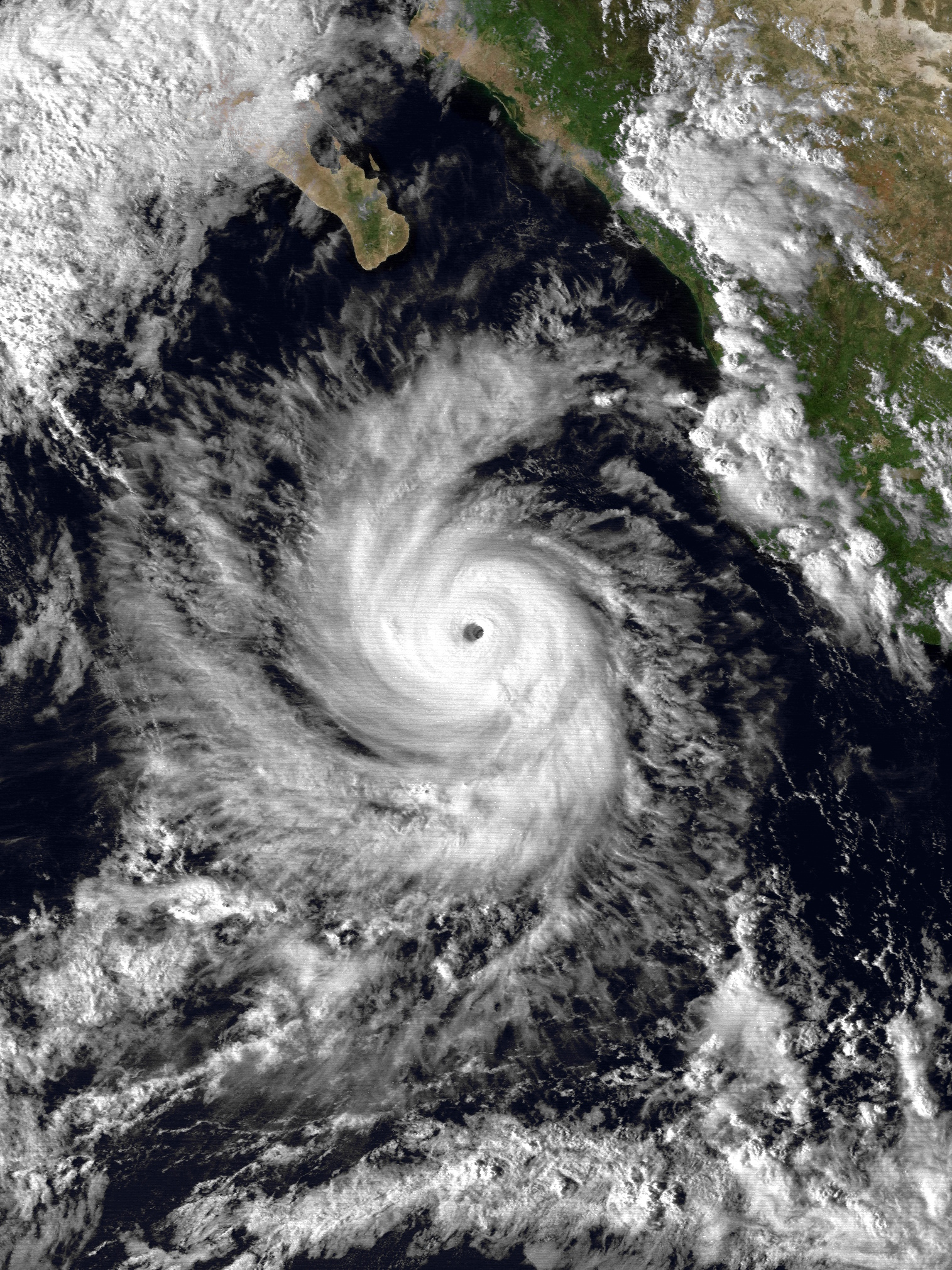
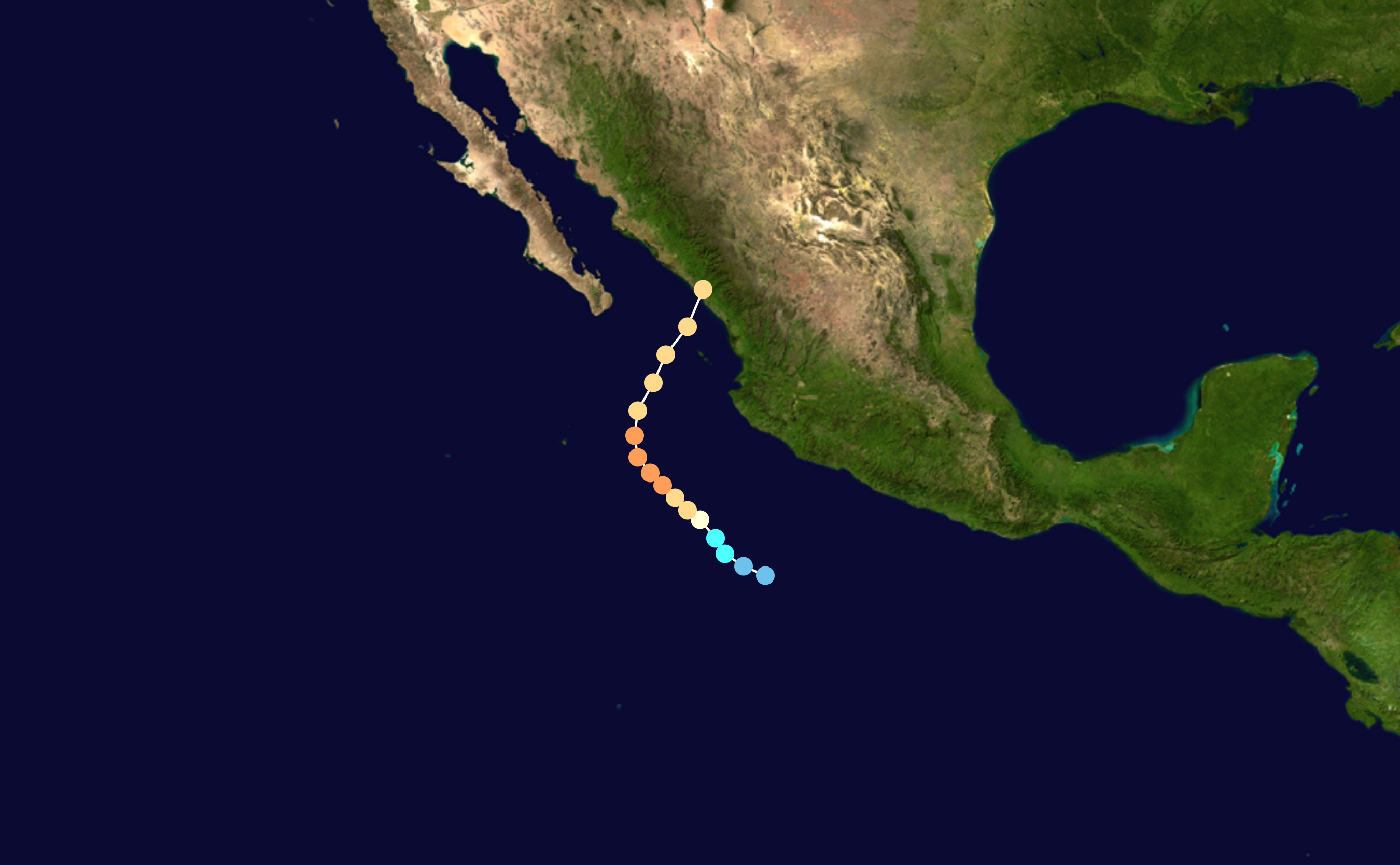
- Duration: October 8 – October 12
- Peak intensity: 125 mph (205 km/h) (1-min);

Early on October 8, a tropical depression had developed far from land. Moving northwest, the storm intensified into Tropical Storm Norma at 0600 UTC. On 1800 UTC October 9, the EPHC upgraded the storm into a hurricane. Subsequently, Norma began to undergo a period rapid intensification; the storm soon reached major hurricane status. The storm reached its peak of 125 mph (205 km/h) at 1800 UTC on October 10. The storm began to accelerate while weakening. After briefly re-intensifying late on October 1, Hurricane Norma made landfall just northeast of Mazatlán with winds of 105 mph (155 km/h) at 1000 UTC on October 12. Although the storm quickly dissipated over land, a second area of low pressure formed over western Texas early on October 13 before the system itself was absorbed by a frontal system on October 14.

Prior to landfall 5,000 people evacuated, thus only one death was reported (a fisherman drowned when his boat capsized in the storm). However, the hurricane caused more devastation in the flood-ravaged region. Agriculture was disrupted, and cattle were killed, causing at least $24 million (1981 USD) in crop damage. Torrential rains caused serious flooding north of Mazatlán. Five thousand two hundred residents need to be evacuated from low-lying areas. The remnants of the storm moved into Texas and Oklahoma. The heavy rainfall caused two rivers to reach flood-stage. A total of five people were killed in the United states, three of these deaths occurred in Fort Worth. During October 13 and 14, a total of 13 tornadoes were reported in northern Texas and southern Oklahoma, including a F2 tornado in McLennan that injured four people and caused $25 million in damage. In Oklahoma, 60 bridges were washed away due to flooding. Total damage in Texas was estimated at $50 million (1981 USD).

=== Hurricane Otis ===
- Category 1 hurricane (SSHWS)
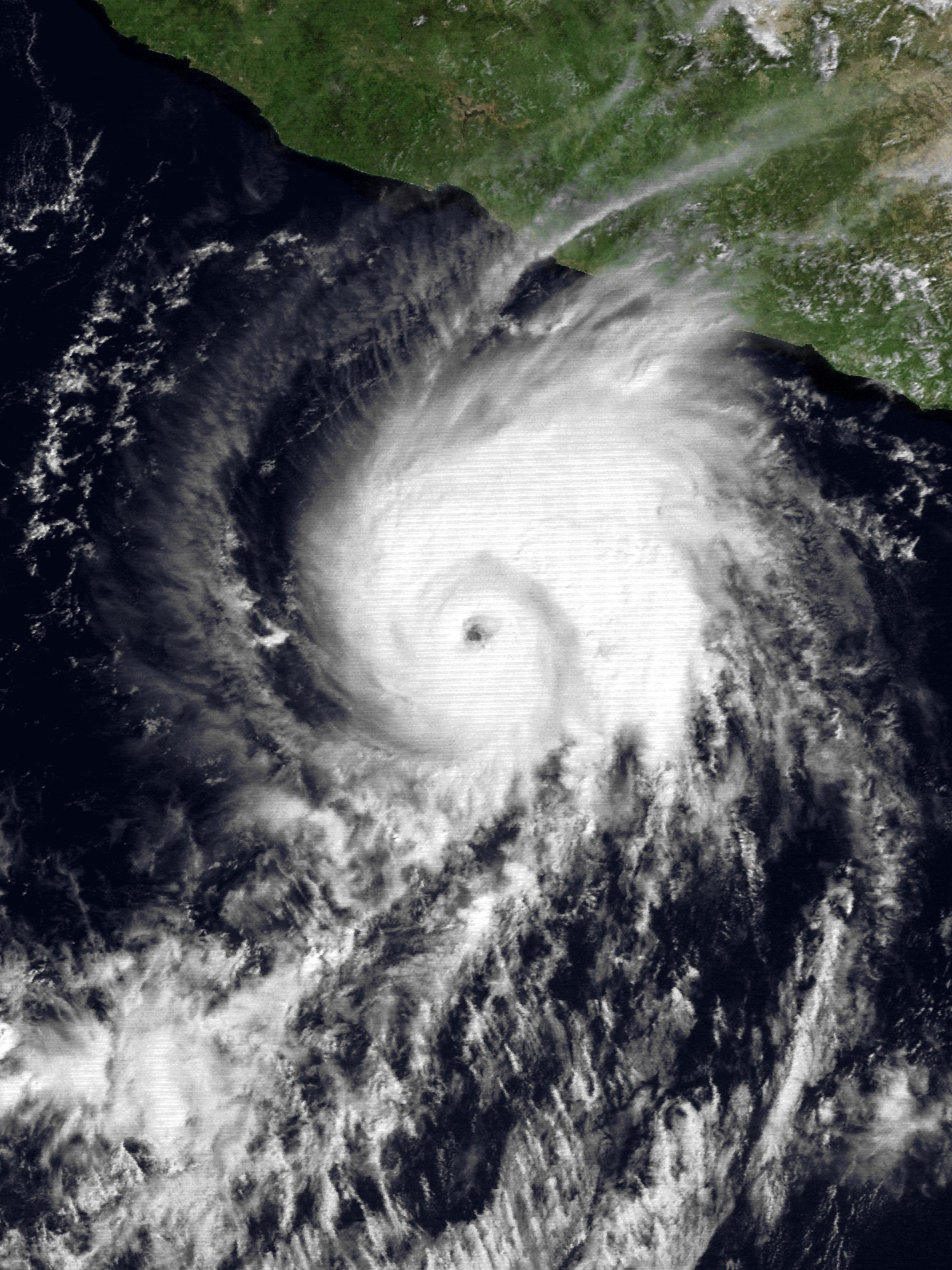
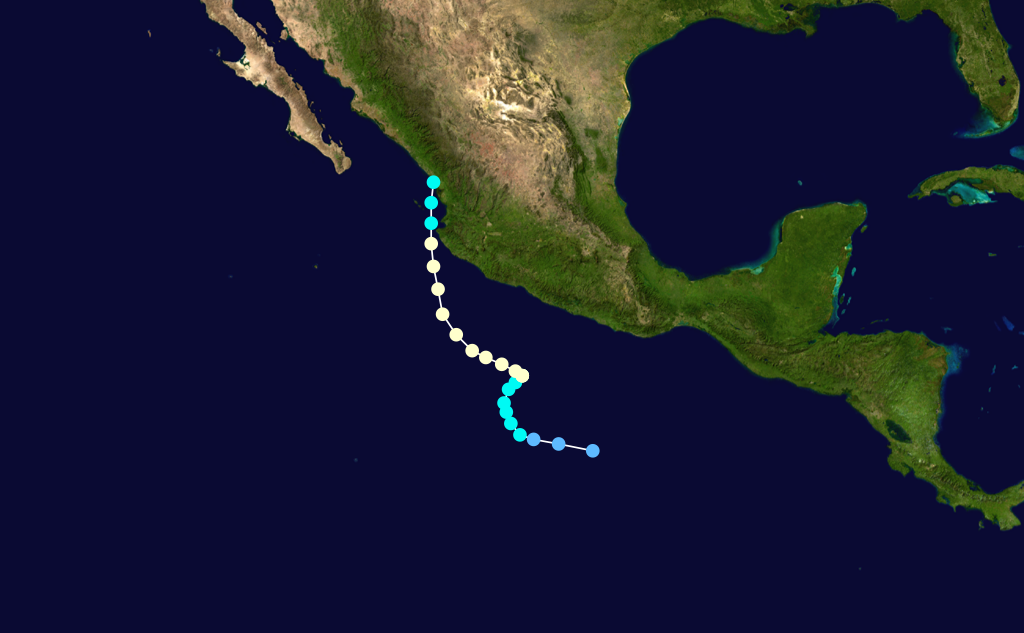
- Duration: October 24 – October 30
- Peak intensity: 85 mph (140 km/h) (1-min);

On October 24, the season's last tropical cyclone developed to the south of the Mexican coastline. Moving towards the west-northwest, the depression quickly strengthened into a tropical storm, receiving the name Otis. Turning towards the north and eventually northeast, Otis steadily strengthened, and intensified into a Category 1 hurricane early on October 26. Sharply bending back towards the west-northwest, and eventually the north, Otis reached a peak intensity of 85 mph (135 km/h) before higher wind shear and cooler sea surface temperatures began to impede on the system's organization. On October 29, Otis skirted the coast of Jalisco as a minimal Category 1 hurricane before weakening to a tropical storm. The next day, Otis made landfall near Mazatlán before being absorbed by a frontal system.

=== Other systems ===
Per the Japan Meteorological Agency, Typhoon Freda briefly existed in the basin as a dissipating tropical storm before being absorbed by another extratropical low on March 17, but the system is not recognized by either NHC or CPHC.

On August 4, a tropical depression developed 800 mi (1,300 km) southwest of Cabo San Lucas. Despite being over warm sea surface temperatures, the depression dissipated the following day as wind shear began to significantly increase. Thus, the depression was never named, and never had any effects on land. Two weeks later, a tropical disturbance developed 210 mi (340 km) south-southeast of Socorro Island drifted north-northwest of a couple of days before organizing into a tropical depression a short distance southwest of Cabo San Lucas. Despite being located over warm sea surface temperatures, it failed to intensify. Tropical Depression Nine-E moved westward for 12 hours prior to dissipation.

== Storm names ==
The following list of names was used for named storms that formed in the North Pacific Ocean east of 140°W in 1981. Most of these names were used for the first time, except for Fernanda, Hilary, and Norma, which were previously used in the old four-year lists. No names were retired from this list following the season, and it was next used (expanded to include "X", "Y", and "Z" names) for the 1987 season.

- Adrian
- Beatriz
- Calvin
- Dora
- Eugene
- Fernanda
- Greg *
- Hilary
- Irwin
- Jova *
- Knut
- Lidia
- Max
- Norma
- Otis
- Pilar (unused)
- Ramon (unused)
- Selma (unused)
- Todd (unused)
- Veronica (unused)
- Wiley (unused)

Had any tropical storms formed in the North Pacific from 140°W to the International Date Line, their names would have come from a series of four rotating lists. Names are used one after the other without regard to year, thus when the bottom of one list is reached, the next named storm receives the name at the top of the next list. Named storms in the table above that crossed into the area during the year are noted (*).

== Season effects ==
1981 Pacific hurricane season statistics
Storm name	Dates active	Storm category at peak intensity	Max 1-min wind mph (km/h)	Min. press. (mbar)	Areas affected	Damage (US$)	Deaths	Ref(s).
Adrian	May 30-June 4	Tropical storm	45 (75)	Unknown	Southwestern Mexico	None	None	
Beatriz	June 28-July 4	Category 1 hurricane	85 (140)	Unknown	Western Mexico, California	None	None	
Calvin	July 4-9	Tropical storm	50 (85)	Unknown	Western Mexico, Baja California Sur, Southwestern United States	None	None	
Dora	July 10-16	Category 1 hurricane	90 (150)	979	None	None	None	
Eugene	July 16-21	Tropical storm	50 (85)	Unknown	Socorro Island	None	None	
Fernanda	August 6-13	Category 2 hurricane	105 (165)	Unknown	None	None	None	
Greg	August 13-22	Category 1 hurricane	75 (120)	Unknown	None	None	None	
Hilary	August 21-28	Category 1 hurricane	85 (140)	Unknown	Western Mexico, Baja California Sur, Socorro Island	None	None	
Irwin	August 27-31	Tropical storm	50 (85)	Unknown	Western Mexico, Baja California Sur	None	None	
Jova	September 14-21	Category 1 hurricane	85 (140)	Unknown	Hawaii	None	None	
Knut	September 19-21	Tropical storm	65 (100)	Unknown	Socorro Island, Baja California Sur, Western Mexico	None	None	
Lidia	October 6-8	Tropical storm	50 (85)	Unknown	Baja California Sur, Northwestern Mexico	$80 million	100	
Max	October 7-10	Tropical storm	50 (85)	Unknown	None	None	None	
Norma	October 8-12	Category 3 hurricane	125 (205)	Unknown	Western Mexico, Texas	$74 million	1 (5)	
Otis	October 24-30	Category 1 hurricane	85 (140)	Unknown	Western Mexico	None	None	
Season aggregates
15 systems	May 30-October 30		125 (205)	Unknown		$154 million	106	

== See also ==
- List of Pacific hurricanes
- Pacific hurricane season
- 1981 Atlantic hurricane season
- 1981 Pacific typhoon season
- 1981 North Indian Ocean cyclone season
- Australian cyclone seasons: 1980–81, 1981–82
- South Pacific cyclone seasons: 1980–81, 1981–82
- South-West Indian Ocean cyclone seasons: 1980–81, 1981–82
