= List of storms named Justine =

The name Justine has been assigned to one tropical cyclone in the South-West Indian Ocean and for one extratropical cyclone in Europe, while the similar name Justin has been used for one tropical cyclone in the Australian region.

In the South-West Indian Ocean:

- Cyclone Justine (1982), the last of the four tropical cyclones to affect Madagascar in the 1981–82 season.

In Europe:

- Storm Justine (2021), affected parts Western Europe, particularly Spain and France.

In the Australian region:

- Cyclone Justin (1997), an erratic and deadly tropical cyclone which severely affected Australia and Papua New Guinea in March 1997. The name Justin was retired in the Australian region after this storm.
