= 1982 hurricane season =

1982 hurricane season may refer to:

- The 1982 Atlantic hurricane season
- The 1982 Pacific hurricane season
