= 1981–82 South-West Indian Ocean cyclone season =

Cyclone season in the Southwest Indian Ocean

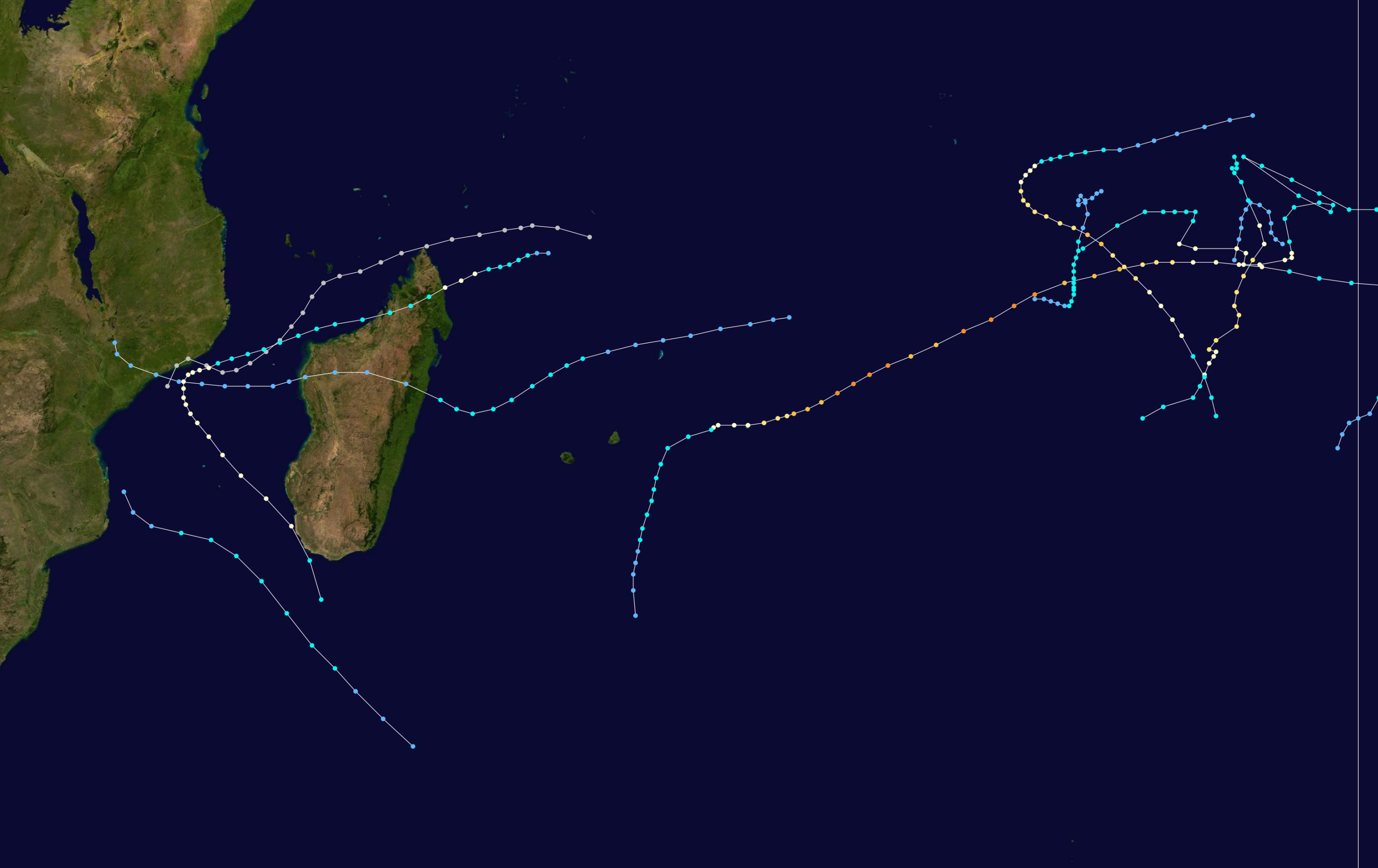
- Season summary map

Seasonal boundaries
- First system formed: 18 October 1981
- Last system dissipated: 4 May 1982

Strongest storm
- Name: Chris-Damia
  - Maximum winds: 215 km/h (130 mph) (10-minute sustained)
  - Lowest pressure: 898 hPa (mbar)

Seasonal statistics
- Total depressions: 14
- Total storms: 10
- Tropical cyclones: 5
- Intense tropical cyclones: 2
- Total fatalities: 100
- Total damage: $250 million (1982 USD)

Related articles
- 1981–82 Australian region cyclone season; 1981–82 South Pacific cyclone season

The 1981–82 South-West Indian Ocean cyclone season was a destructive and deadly cyclone season that occurred in areas near or in Madagascar, where four cyclones killed 100 people and caused $250 million (USD) in damage overall. The season was fairly active, lasting from October to May. There were nine named storms that attained gale-force winds, or at least 65 km/h (40 mph). Five of the storms attained tropical cyclone status, which have 10-minute sustained winds of at least 120 km/h (75 mph).

The first storm was Tropical Cyclone Alex, which was named by the Australian Bureau of Meteorology (BoM). this was due to the boundary of the basin at the time, which incorporated the Indian Ocean south of the equator and extended from the east coast of Africa to 80° E; the eastern extent was later moved to 90° E. Two other storms – Armelle and Damia – also originated in the Australian basin. The latter was the strongest cyclone on record in the basin at the time by barometric pressure, estimated at 898 mbar (26.52 inHg). The first storm to affect Madagascar was Benedicte in December, and was followed by tropical storms Frida and Electre in February and Justine in March. The final storm of the season was Cyclone Karla, which remained in the eastern periphery of the basin while reaching winds of 170 km/h (105 mph).

== Season summary ==
Météo-France's meteorological office at Réunion (MFR) issued advisories for storms in the basin during the year. At the time, the MFR area of warning responsibility was from the coast of Africa to 80° E, and the agency primarily used the Dvorak technique to estimate the intensities of tropical cyclones. The nine tropical storms and five tropical cyclones was identical to the long-term average from 1981 to 2011.

The Joint Typhoon Warning Center (JTWC), which is a joint United States Navy – United States Air Force task force that issues tropical cyclone warnings for the region, also issued advisories for storms in the year. The agency tracked a tropical depression in July 1982. The system formed on July 4 southeast of Seychelles, and initially curved to the southwest. It failed to intensify beyond winds of 55 km/h (35 mph), and dissipated on July 4 after turning to the northwest. At the time, the annual tropical cyclone year was from August 1 to July 31 of the subsequent year.

Four storms struck Madagascar in the season between December and March, collectively killing 100 people and causing $250 million (1982 United States dollars) in damage. The storms caused widespread flooding and a state of disaster for four months, compounded by floods in January. About 180,000 people were forced to evacuate, and there were increased levels of flood-related diseases. The storms closed down many roads and destroyed widespread crops, forcing the government to import 400,000 metric tons of rice. After the floods, workers repaired damaged roads and dykes while the government provided relief supplies. However, the ongoing floods strained the Madagascar's resources, and the government appealed for aid to the international community on February 4. The United States Agency for International Development provided nearly $9 million in aid, mostly for rice and rebuilding roads. Other countries donated about $7.5 million in money or relief goods, such as building materials, food, clothing, and medicine.

== Systems ==
=== Tropical Cyclone Alex ===
- Tropical cyclone (MFR)
- Category 2 tropical cyclone (SSHWS)
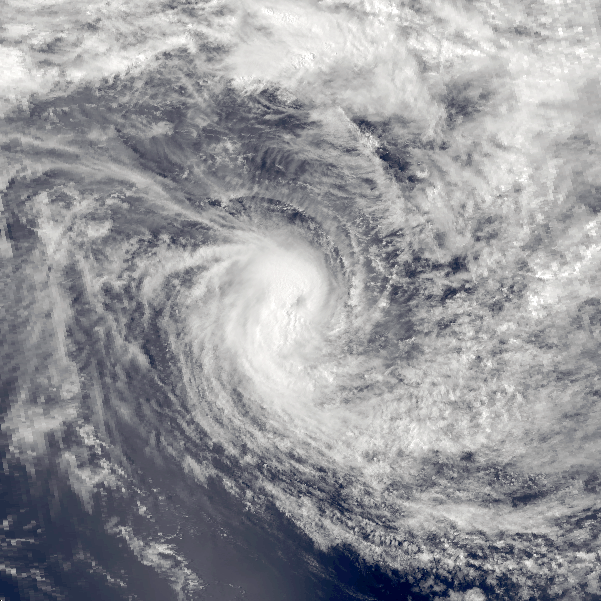
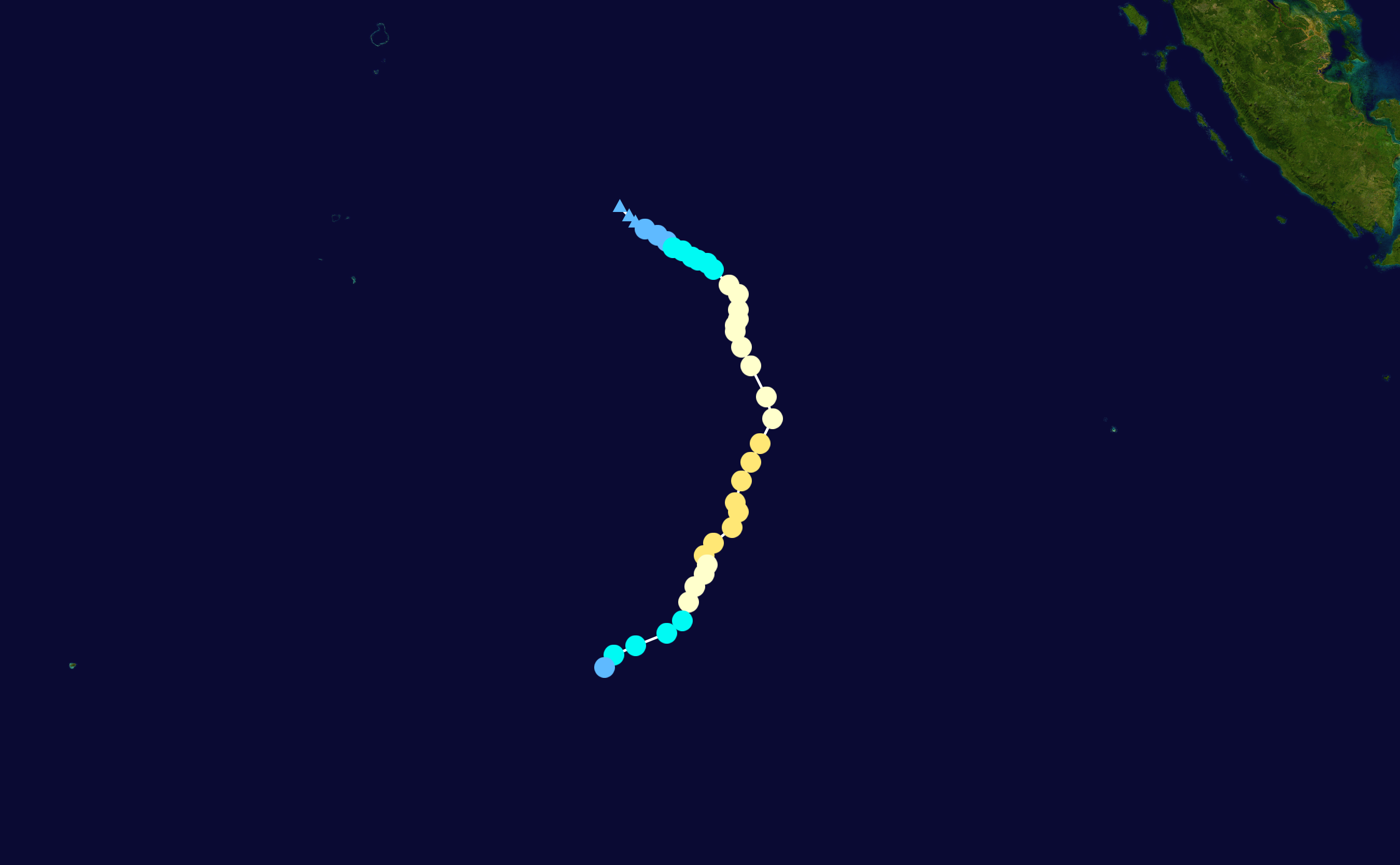
- Duration: October 18 – October 27
- Peak intensity: 150 km/h (90 mph) (10-min); 964 hPa (mbar)

While still in the Southern Hemisphere spring, the Intertropical Convergence Zone (ITCZ) was active across the southern Indian Ocean in the middle of October. On October 18, a low-pressure area formed, based on reports from nearby ships. It moved southeastward and slowly intensified, given the name Alex. Located southwest of Sumatra, the storm curved to the south. Late on October 21, Alex attained peak winds of 150 kilometres per hour (93 mph), or above tropical cyclone status. For several days, it maintained much of its intensity while curving to the southwest. The storm eventually weakened due to strong wind shear deteriorating the convection. On October 27, Alex dissipated.

The storm developed east of 80° E but west of 90° E, which at the time was part of the warning responsibility for the Australian Bureau of Meteorology (BoM). However, the MFR expanded its area of responsibility to 90° E in 1985.

=== Severe Tropical Storm Bessi–Armelle ===
- Severe tropical storm (MFR)
- Category 1 tropical cyclone (SSHWS)
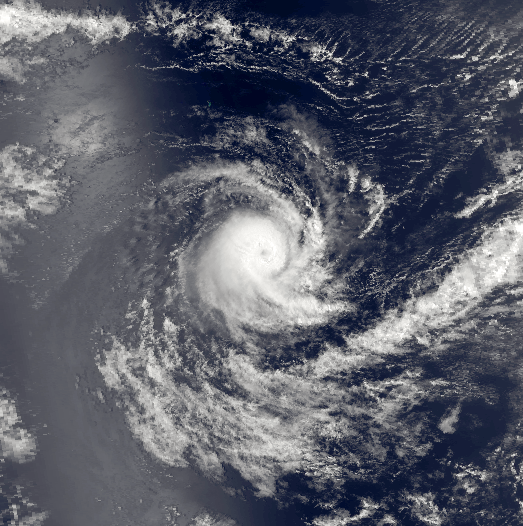
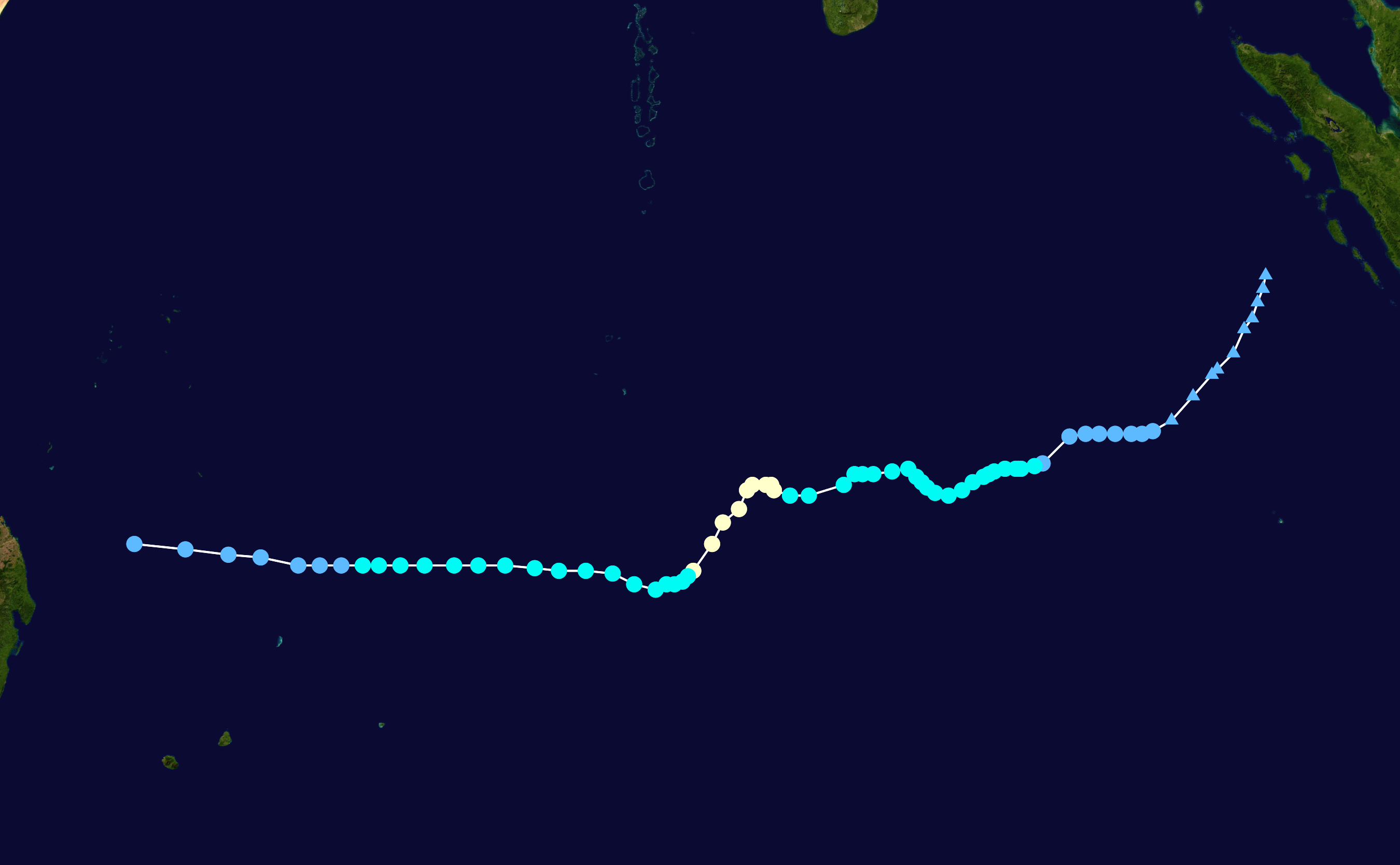
- Duration: November 6 – November 20
- Peak intensity: 100 km/h (65 mph) (10-min); 976 hPa (mbar)

On November 1, an area of convection formed southwest of Sumatra just south of the equator. It moved southwestward and slowly developed a distinct low-pressure area. On November 6, the system strengthened enough for the BoM to name it Bessi while the storm was west of 90° E. The MFR began tracking the storm on November 8 once it reached 85° E, estimating winds of 100 km/h (60 mph). Two days later, a nearby ship reported winds of 63 km/h (39 mph). During this time, the storm moved generally west-southwestward, crossing 80° E on November 11; at that time, the Mauritius Meteorology Service renamed it Armelle. The storm continued westward and gradually weakened. On November 18, Armell deteriorated to tropical depression status, dissipating two days later between Tromelin Island and the Seychelles.

=== Tropical Cyclone Benedicte ===
- Tropical cyclone (MFR)
- Category 2 tropical cyclone (SSHWS)
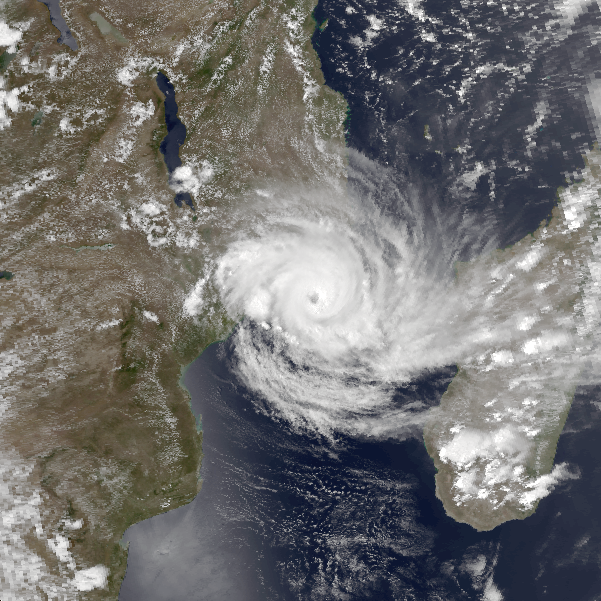
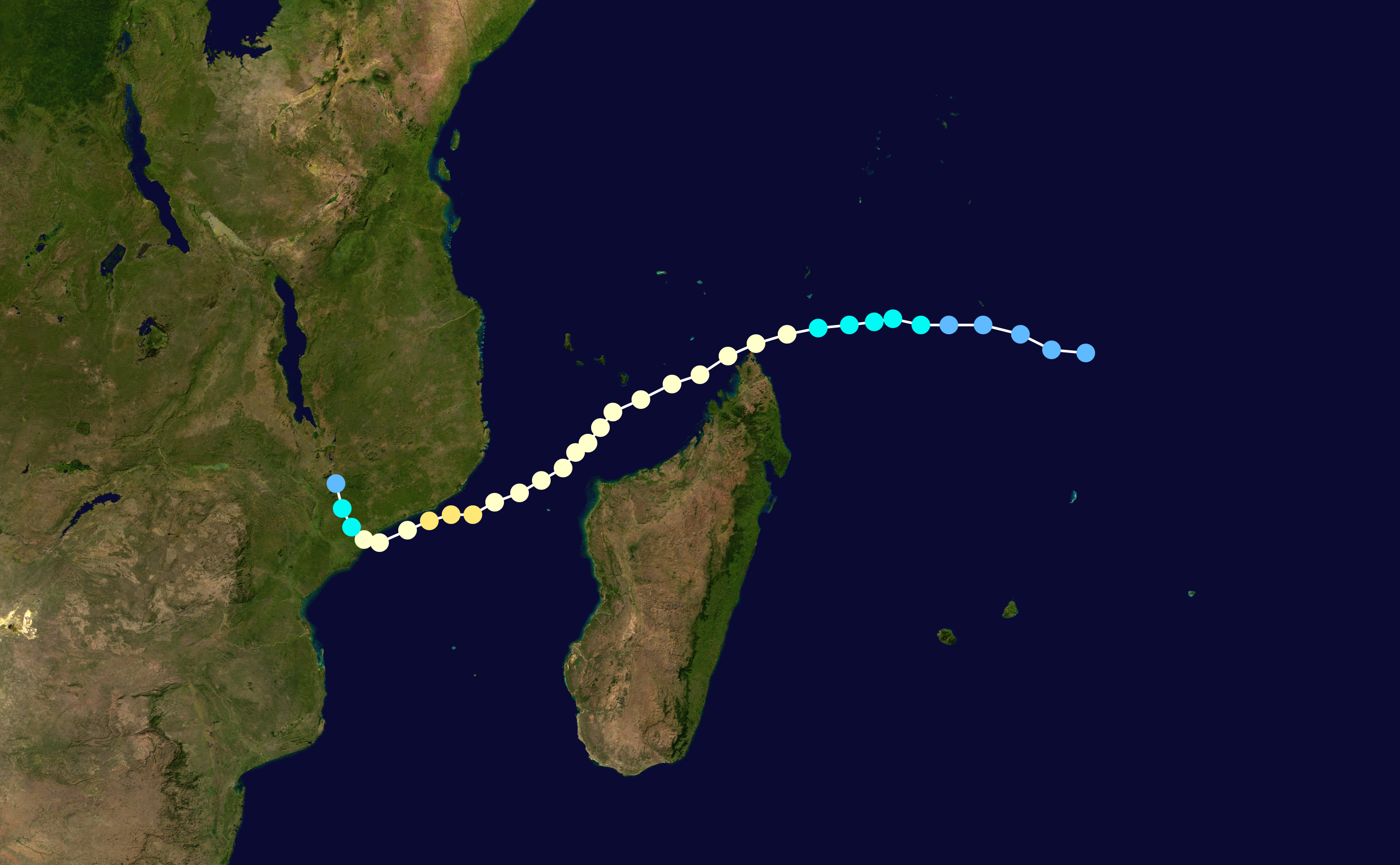
- Duration: December 17 – December 25
- Peak intensity: 135 km/h (85 mph) (10-min); 954 hPa (mbar)

In the middle of December, the ITCZ was active across the southern Indian Ocean, northeast of Madagascar. A circulation developed on December 16, which preceded the development of a tropical disturbance on December 17. Moving to the west-northwest, the system slowly developed before shifting to the southwest. On December 19, the system intensified into a moderate tropical storm while passing 75 km (45 mi) north of Madagascar. After briefly developing an eye feature, the satellite presentation degraded due to land interaction. Convection increased as the storm progressed through the Mozambique Channel, and the Madagascar Meteorological Service named it Benedicte on December 20. The organization improved over the next few days as the eye feature became better defined. On December 23, Benedicte intensified to tropical cyclone status, reaching peak winds of 135 km/h (85 mph). That day, the storm turned westward toward the Mozambique coast, weakening as it approached land. Benedicte made landfall on central Mozambique on December 24 and turned northward, straddling the border with Malawi. The storm dissipated on the next day, with only a remnant area of clouds present on satellite imagery by December 26.

While passing just north of Madagascar, Benedicte brought wind gusts of 252 km/h (157 mph) to Antsiranana, with several other localities reporting gale-force winds. Antsiranana also reported 178 mm (7.0 in). The storm damaged thousands of homes and wrecked much of the region's coffee and pepper crops. Benedicte killed 13 people and was the first in a succession of six storms that flooded the country.

=== Tropical Depression Clarissee ===
- Tropical depression (MFR)
- Tropical storm (SSHWS)
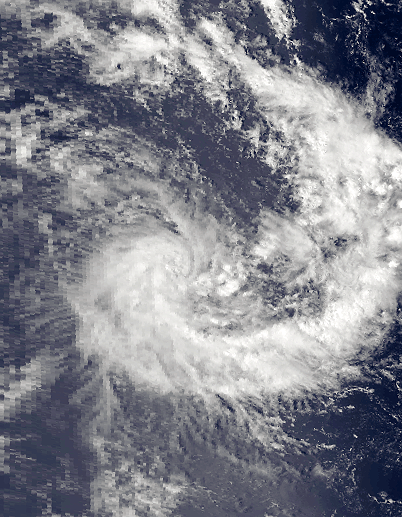
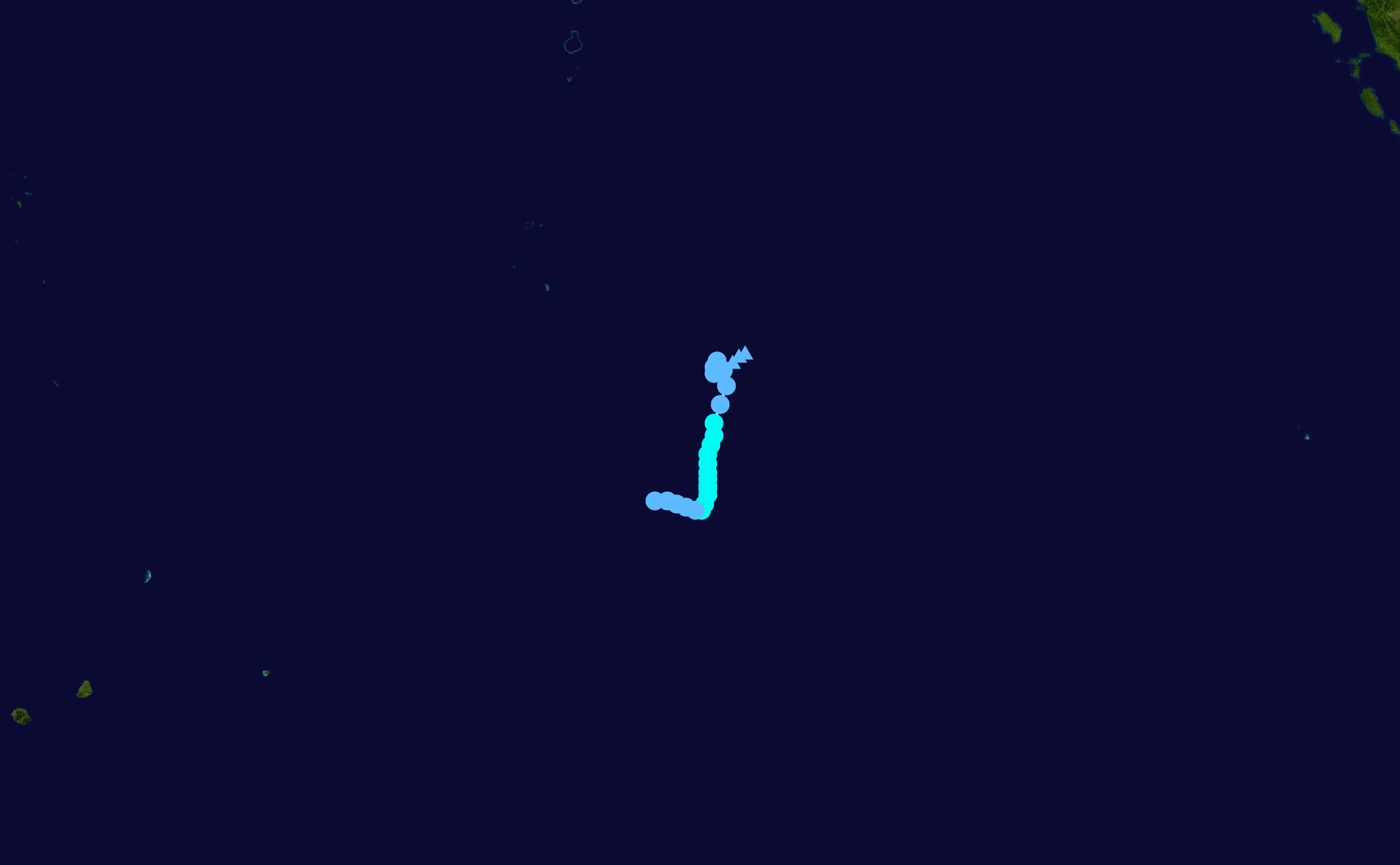
- Duration: December 29 – January 7
- Peak intensity: 50 km/h (30 mph) (10-min); 990 hPa (mbar)

Toward the end of December, strong convection persisted southeast of Diego Garcia. These storms consolidated into a distinct center on December 29, warranting its classification as a tropical depression. For several days the system meandered – it moved northward on December 30 due to a ridge to the south, although soon thereafter turned back to the south and later to the west. Due to a Dvorak rating of 2.5, the Mauritius Meteorology Service named the system Clarisse. According to the MFR, the system only had peak winds of 50 km/h (30 mph), as lack of atmospheric instability prevented strengthening. However, the JTWC estimated 1 minute winds of 85 km/h (55 mph). Clarisse dissipated on January 7 about 500 km (310 mi) east of St. Brandon.

=== Intense Tropical Cyclone Chris–Damia ===
- Intense tropical cyclone (MFR)
- Category 4 tropical cyclone (SSHWS)
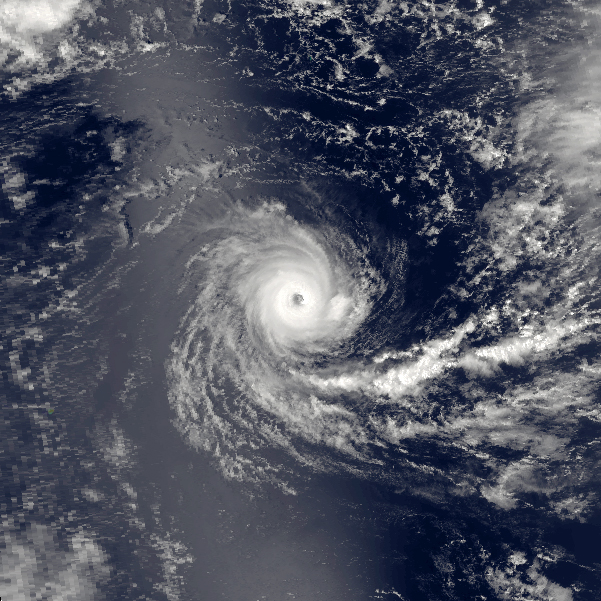
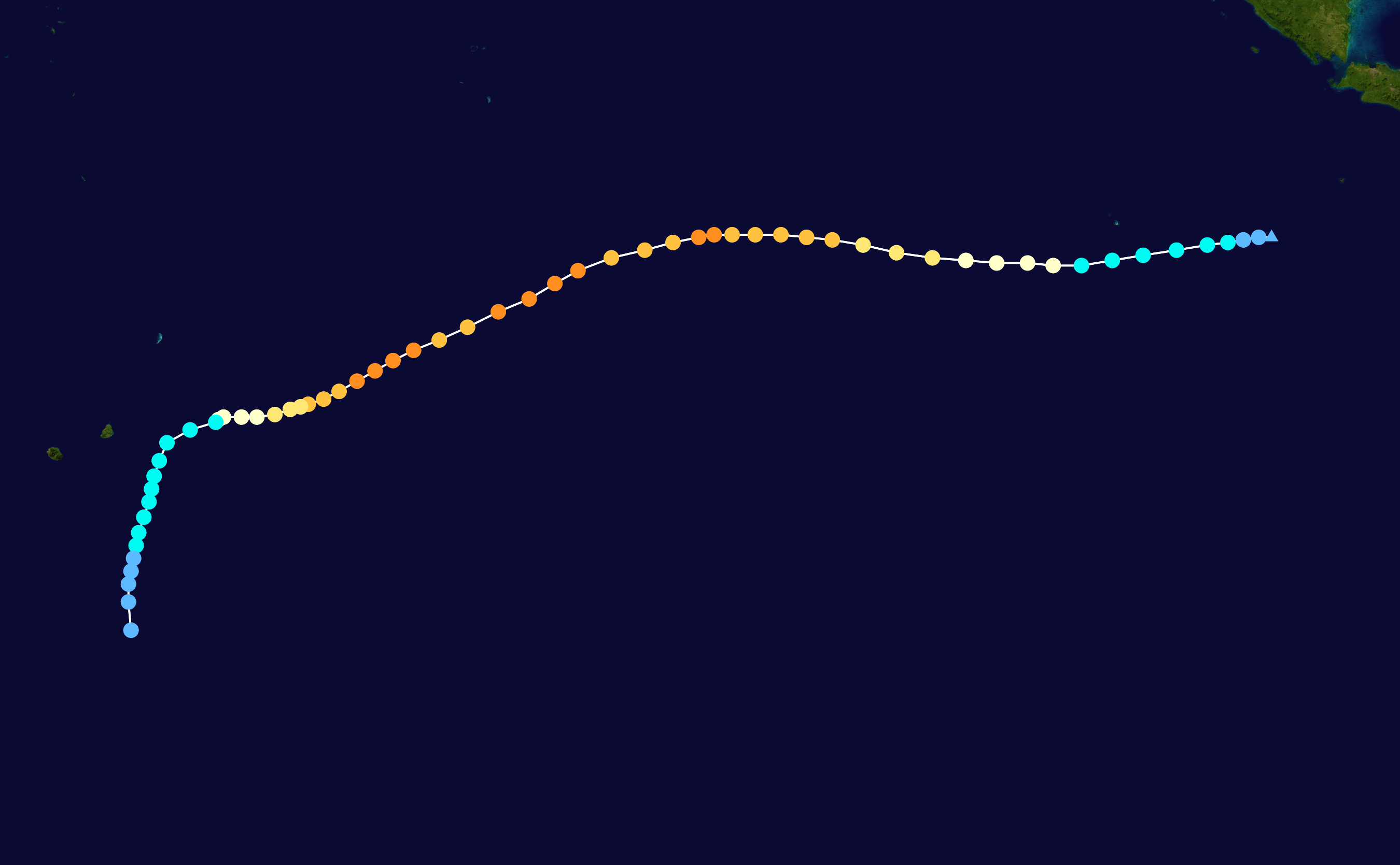
- Duration: January 11 (Entered basin) – January 21
- Peak intensity: 215 km/h (130 mph) (10-min); 898 hPa (mbar)

A low-pressure area developed on January 5 near Christmas Island in the Australian basin. Moving westward due to a large anticyclone to the south, it gradually intensified and was named Chris by the BoM. The storm developed an eye on January 9, and that day crossed 90° E into the south-west Indian Ocean. On January 11, the Mauritius Meteorology Service renamed the storm as Damia. On the next day, the Dvorak rating reached 6.0 for the storm, and the MFR estimated peak 10 minute winds of 215 km/h (135 mph), making it an intense tropical cyclone. The agency also estimated a minimum barometric pressure of 898 mbar (26.52 inHg). Damia turned southwestward and slowly weakened; by January 16, the cyclone weakened to tropical storm status, although it reintensified into a tropical cyclone the next day. Around that time, the storm passed about 20 km (12 mi) north of Rodrigues and later approached Mauritius before curving to the south. As a weakened tropical storm, Damia later curved more to the southeast and dissipated on January 23.

On Rodrigues, Damia produced wind gusts of 113 km/h (70 mph) as well as nearly 300 mm (12 in) of rainfall in 24 hours. The storm damaged or destroyed 70 houses, forcing 500 people to shelters, while 100 km (60 mi) of unpaved roads were wrecked. Power, telephone, and water access was disrupted. Damia heavily damaged the island's agriculture, with 25% of the corn crop destroyed. Several fishing boats were wrecked, and 15% of forest areas were damaged. Monetary damage was estimated at $650,000 (USD), which prompted the government to request international aid for rebuilding.

=== Moderate Tropical Storm Electre ===
- Moderate tropical storm (MFR)
- Tropical storm (SSHWS)
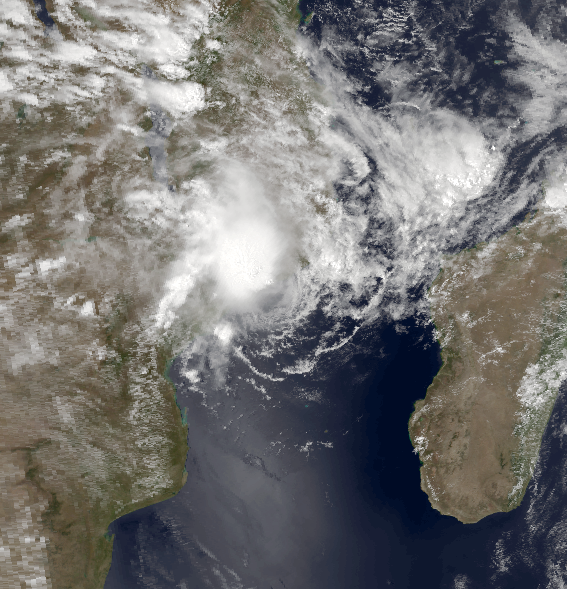
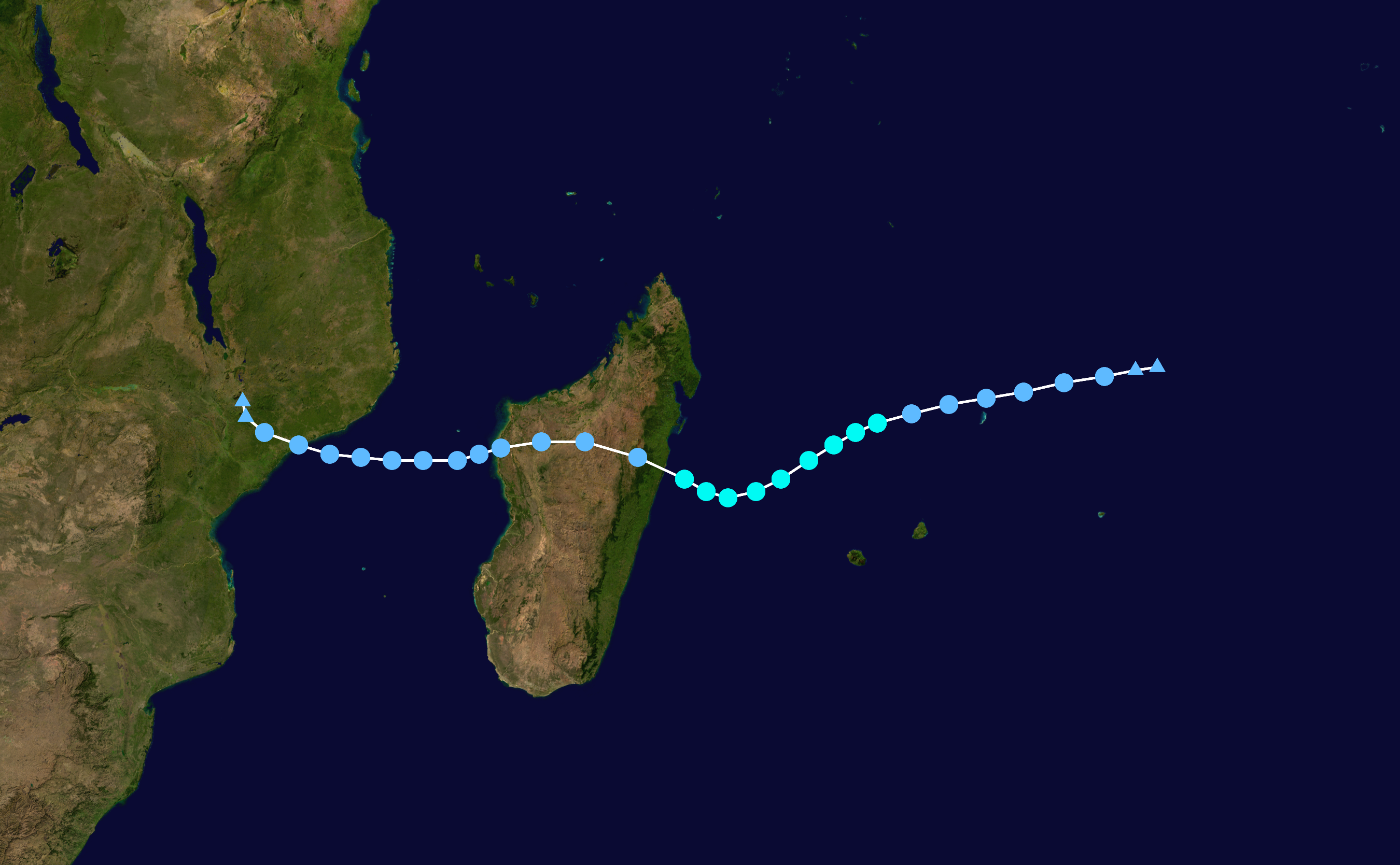
- Duration: January 30 – February 6
- Peak intensity: 80 km/h (50 mph) (10-min); 984 hPa (mbar)

The ITCZ became active toward the end of January from the coast of Madagascar to Diego Garcia, spawning a distinct circulation on January 31 southeast of Tromelin Island, which became a tropical disturbance. Due to a trough, the system moved west-southwestward toward Madagascar. On February 1, the system was named Electre as it gradually intensified. Two days later, the storm moved ashore eastern Madagascar between Toamasina and Mahanoro with peak winds of 80 km/h (50 mph). Electre weakened as it crossed the country and emerged into the Mozambique Channel on February 4 south of Maintirano. The storm re-intensified to its former peak intensity as it turned west-northwest. On February 5, Electre made its final landfall on central Mozambique between Lumbo and Quelimane, dissipating soon thereafter.

Striking the country just two days after Tropical Storm Frida affected the region, Electre brought additional rainfall, with a peak 24‑hour total of 151.1 mm (5.95 in) at Mahanoro. The storm also produced peak winds of 119 km/h (74 mph) in Mananjary. Electre caused flooding and landslides, particularly in the area around Lake Alaotra. The storm damaged all roads from eastern Madagascar to the capital city Antananarivo, as well as the rail connecting the city with Toamasina. There were 13 deaths in the country.

=== Moderate Tropical Storm Frida ===
- Moderate tropical storm (MFR)
- Tropical storm (SSHWS)
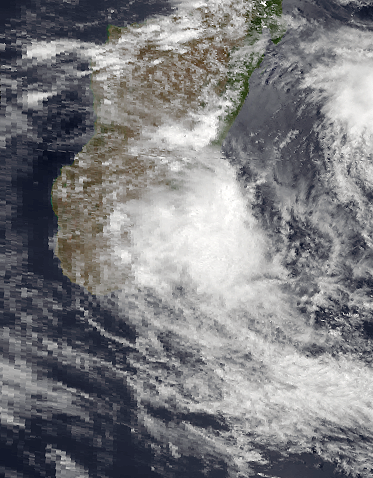
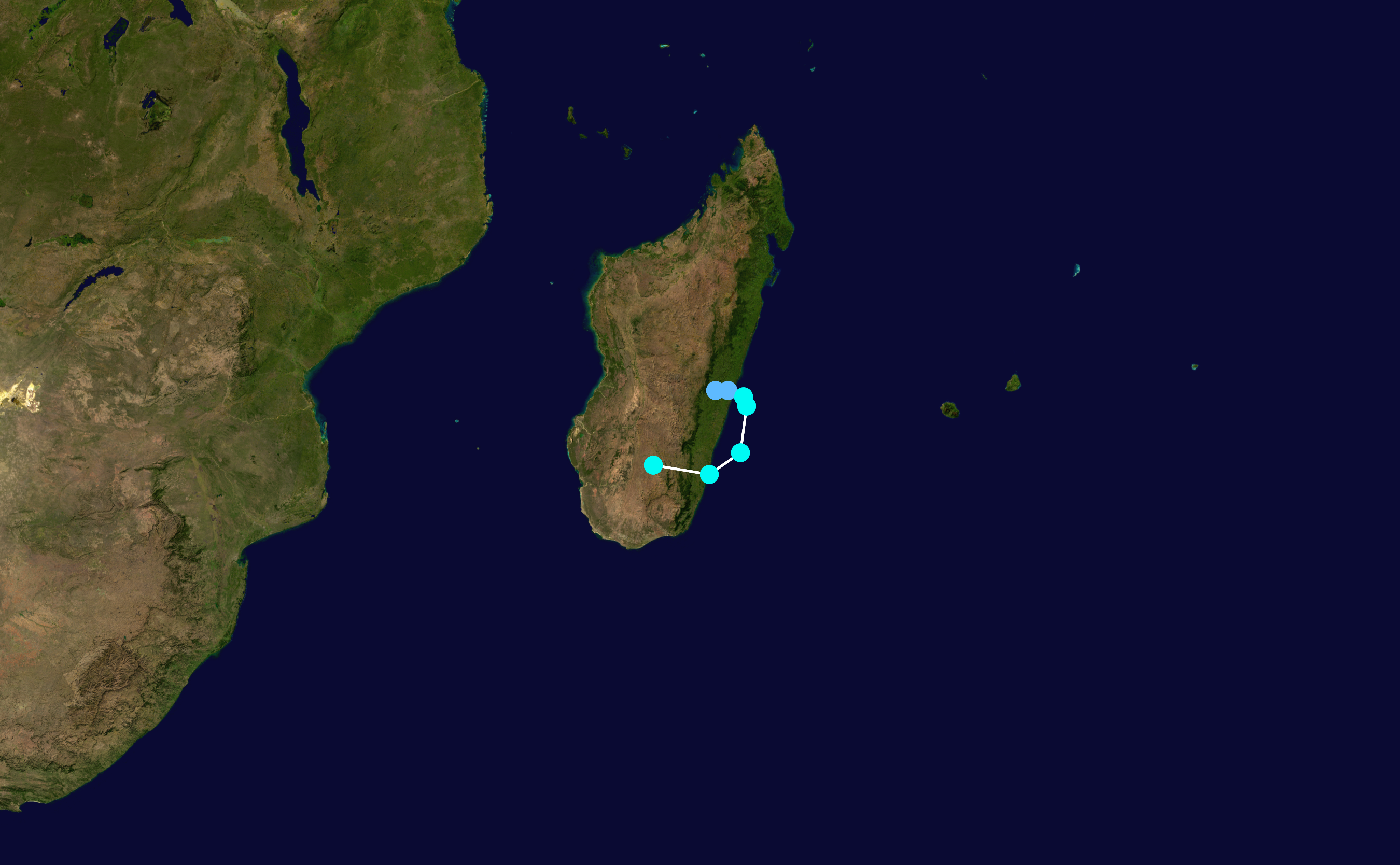
- Duration: January 31 – February 1
- Peak intensity: 65 km/h (40 mph) (10-min); 991 hPa (mbar)

Tropical Storm Frida developed on January 31 over east-central Madagascar, between Fianarantsoa and Mahanoro. It moved offshore and turned to the south. On February 1, the storm intensified to peak winds of 65 km/h (40 mph) before turning westward and moving back ashore, steered by a ridge. Frida dissipated later that day, producing wind gusts of 119 km/h (74 mph) in Farafangana. As the storm moved through the former Fianarantsoa Province, it dropped rainfall that flooded and isolated several towns. The floods washed away bridges and knocked down power lines.

=== Moderate Tropical Storm Gabrielle ===
- Moderate tropical storm (MFR)
- Category 1 tropical cyclone (SSHWS)
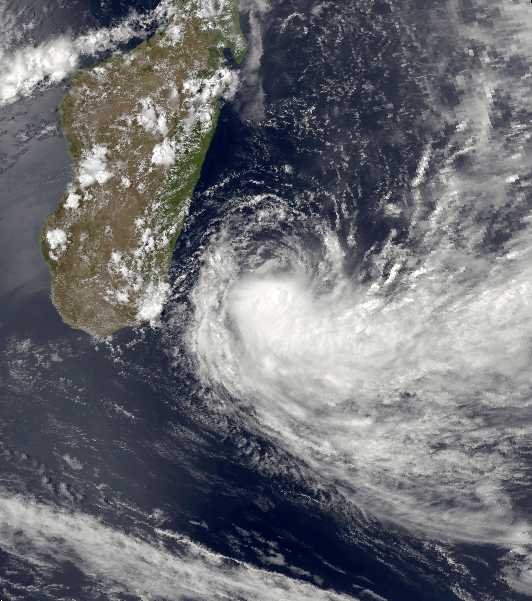
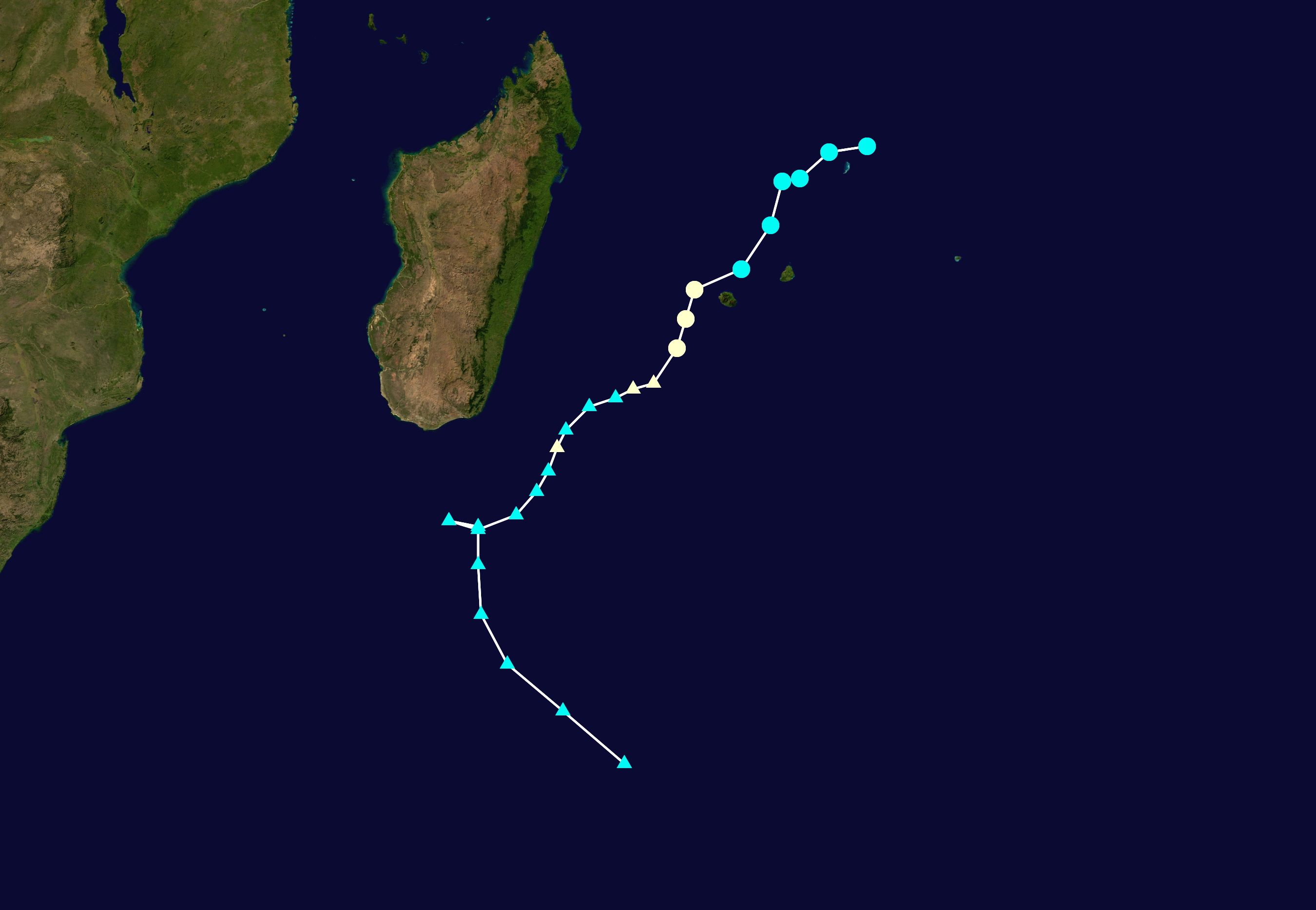
- Duration: February 5 – February 11
- Peak intensity: 80 km/h (50 mph) (10-min); 984 hPa (mbar)

On February 5, a tropical disturbance formed north of St. Brandon, and quickly intensified into Tropical Storm Gabrielle by the next day. Moving to the southwest, the storm attained peak winds of 80 km/h (50 mph). On February 6, Gabrielle passed northwest of Mauritius and Réunion; on the latter island, the mountainous peak Plaine des Cafres recorded gusts of 158 km/h (98 mph). The storm continued to the southwest without much change in intensity, weakening slightly on February 9. That day, Gabrielle turned to the west-northwest and executed a tight loop before progressing southward. After turning to the southeast, the storm dissipated on February 11.

=== Tropical Cyclone Justine ===
- Tropical cyclone (MFR)
- Category 1 tropical cyclone (SSHWS)
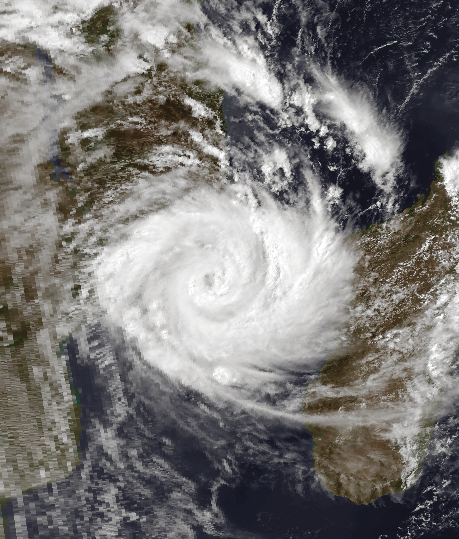
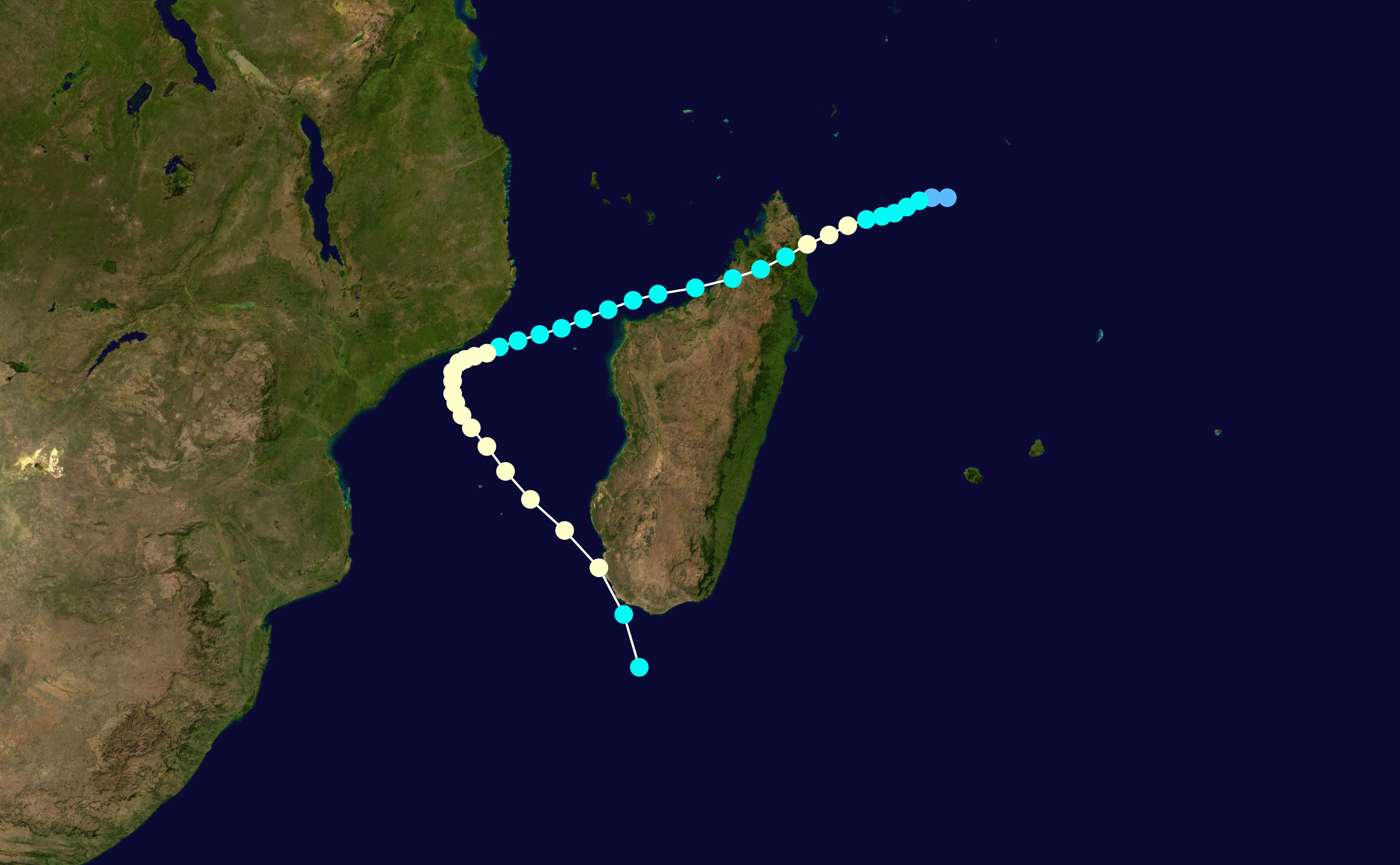
- Duration: March 16 – March 25
- Peak intensity: 150 km/h (95 mph) (10-min); 941 hPa (mbar)

The ITCZ became active in the middle of March northeast of Madagascar, which spawned two low-pressure areas on March 15. The westernmost became a tropical disturbance on the next day between Madagascar and Tromelin. It quickly intensified while tracking to the southwest and was named Justine on March 17. On March 18, the storm intensified into tropical cyclone status and developed a well-defined eye. At 15:00 UTC that day, Justine moved ashore northeastern Madagascar near Sambava. It continued southwestward and weakened over the island, emerging into the Mozambique Channel near Besalampy as a tropical storm. It re-intensified into a tropical cyclone over waters, reaching peak winds of 150 km/h (95 mph) on March 22 only 20 km (12 mi) offshore Mozambique. That day, a ridge over southern Africa steered Justine to the southeast away from land, although the ridge weakened and allowed the storm to move back to the west-southwest. It weakened to a tropical storm during this time. The storm turned again to the southeast on March 24 after the ridge moved to the east. Justine passed north of Europa Island before striking Madagascar again early on March 25 just north of Toliara. It became extratropical over land, and soon again reached open waters while turning to the south. Justine dissipated on March 27 within the flow of the westerlies.

While entering the Mozambique Channel, Justine was restrengthening and produced peak winds of 180 km/h (110 mph) in Besalampy. The storm also dropped heavy rainfall, with a 24‑hour peak of 404.5 mm (15.93 in) in Sambava where it moved ashore. The storm was the final in a series of storms affecting the country, damaging coastal towns in the northeast and southwest. Justine damaged houses, crops, and roads, while destroying a vanilla storage shed in Sambava. While the storm was changing its trajectory offshore Mozambique, the Commandant Bourdais ship attempted to avoid the storm, only to sail through 102 kilometres per hour (63 mph) gusts and 14 m (46 ft) waves, which flooded the deck and damaged a gangway. Later, Justine passed near Europa island, producing 6 to 9 m (20 to 30 ft) waves.

=== Intense Tropical Cyclone Karla ===
- Intense tropical cyclone (MFR)
- Category 3 tropical cyclone (SSHWS)
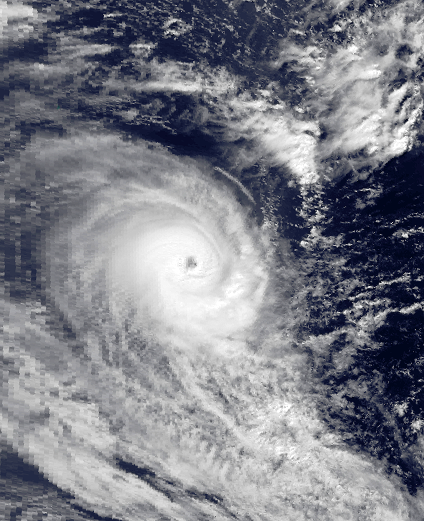
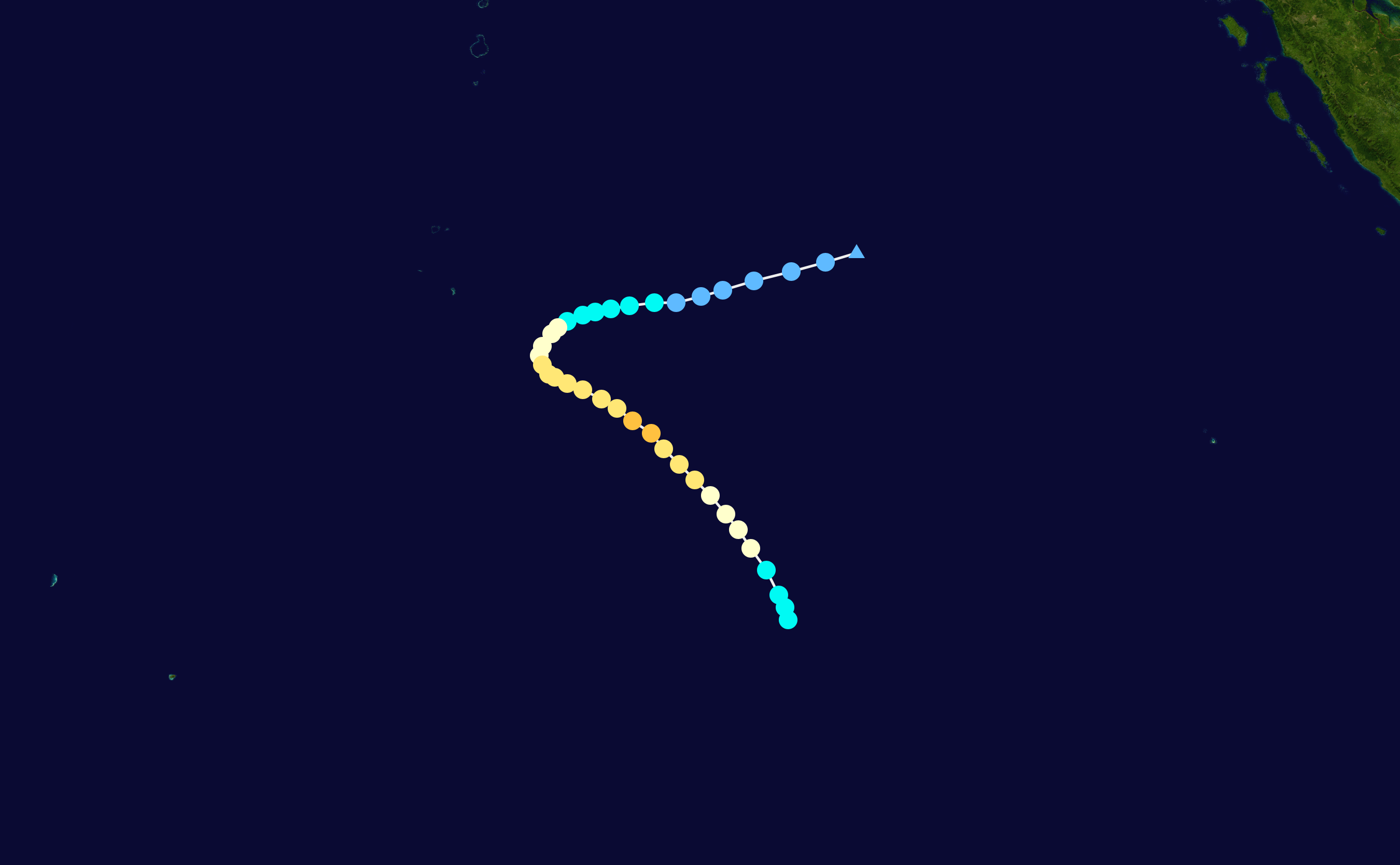
- Duration: April 23 – May 4
- Peak intensity: 170 km/h (105 mph) (10-min); 927 hPa (mbar)

A low pressure persisted toward the end of April between Diego Garcia and the equator. It developed a spiral area of convection on April 24, which preceded the development of a tropical disturbance the next day. By that time, the system was already at tropical storm status and was given the name Karla. Moving southwest, the storm strengthened and organized. A ridge to the south steered Karla to the east on April 27, although an approaching trough turned it to the southeast on the following day. Enhanced atmospheric instability helped the storm strengthen to tropical cyclone status on April 29. On the next day, Karla attained peak winds of 170 km/h (105 mph) after developing a well-defined eye. Increased wind shear and progressively cooler waters weakened the cyclone as it turned more to the south. By May 3, the storm weakened to tropical depression status and dissipated the next day within the westerlies.

=== Other systems ===
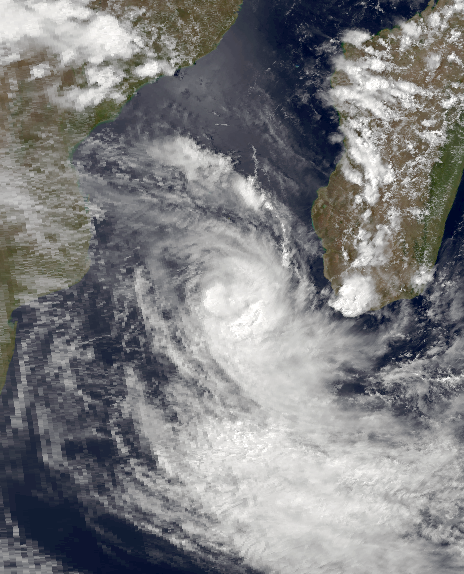
Satellite image of February tropical depression near Madagascar

A tropical depression formed south of Diego Garcia on February 12. Given the name Heberte, it moved southward initially, reaching winds of only 50 km/h (30 mph). A ridge to the south turned the system back north, and Heberte dissipated on February 14 near where it formed.

There were three short-lived tropical depressions toward the end of February. The first formed on February 19 about 350 km (220 mi) northeast of Tromelin Island. It moved southward toward Mauritius, bringing several days of heavy rainfall there and Réunion. The depression turned to the west-northwest and dissipated on February 23. That day, the other two depressions formed, including one between Réunion and Madagascar. Given the name Isabeau, it moved westward and dissipated on February 24, reaching winds of only 50 km/h (30 mph). The other depression originated in the Mozambique Channel off the southwest coast of Madagascar. On February 24, the system passed south of the island while moving southeastward, bringing wind gusts of 79 km/h (49 mph) at Tôlanaro. It gradually became extratropical, dissipating within the westerlies on February 26. The JTWC classified the system as Tropical Cyclone 20S, estimating 1 minute winds of 85 km/h (55 mph), although it was only officially classified as a tropical depression.

== See also ==
- Atlantic hurricane seasons: 1981, 1982
- Eastern Pacific hurricane seasons: 1981, 1982
- Western Pacific typhoon seasons: 1981, 1982
- North Indian Ocean cyclone seasons: 1981, 1982
