= 1982 Atlantic hurricane season =

- Season summary map

Seasonal boundaries
- First system formed: June 2, 1982
- Last system dissipated: October 3, 1982

Strongest storm
- Name: Debby
  - Maximum winds: 130 mph (215 km/h) (1-minute sustained)
  - Lowest pressure: 950 mbar (hPa; 28.05 inHg)

Seasonal statistics
- Total depressions: 8
- Total storms: 6
- Hurricanes: 2 (record low in the satellite era, tied with 1972 and 2013)
- Major hurricanes (Cat. 3+): 1
- Total fatalities: 30 total
- Total damage: $100 million (1982 USD)

Related articles
- Timeline of the 1982 Atlantic hurricane season; 1982 Pacific hurricane season; 1982 Pacific typhoon season; 1982 North Indian Ocean cyclone season

The 1982 Atlantic hurricane season was a well-below average Atlantic hurricane season with five named tropical storms and one subtropical storm. Two storms became hurricanes, one of which reached major hurricane status. The season officially began on June 1, 1982, and lasted until November 30, 1982. These dates conventionally delimit the period of each year when most tropical cyclones form in the Atlantic basin. Activity started early with Hurricane Alberto forming on the second day of the season. Alberto threatened the Southwestern Florida coast as a tropical storm, meadering offshore in the southeastern Gulf of Mexico and causing 23 fatalities in Cuba. The next system, a subtropical storm, formed later in June and affected the same area as Alberto, causing $10 million in damage.

Tropical Storm Beryl formed on August 28, after a quiet July in the open Atlantic Ocean. Beryl grazed Cape Verde, killing 3 people. Tropical Depression Three formed just behind Beryl, tracking east and north of the Caribbean sea in early September. Soon after the dissipation of Beryl, Tropical Storm Chris hit Sabine Pass, Texas. Hurricane Debby was the next storm and the strongest of the season. The formative stage of Debby produced rainfall in Puerto Rico, causing one death on the island, and soon strengthened into a Category 4 major hurricane. Debby passed by Newfoundland on September 18 and merged with a non-tropical low on September 20. In mid-September, Tropical Depression Six formed west of Africa, and tracked west-northwest, dissipating before reaching the Leeward Islands on September 20. Its remnant thunderstorm activity continued moving west-northwest, forming Tropical Depression Seven which moved near Bermuda on September 25 before dissipating offshore Nova Scotia. The final storm of the season, Tropical Storm Ernesto, was the shortest-lasting system and stayed out to sea, dissipating on October 3.

== Season summary ==
The 1982 Atlantic hurricane season officially began on June 1 and ended on November 30. The season was very inactive because of strong vertical wind shear due to stronger than normal westerly winds aloft. The wind shear was contributed by a variety of factors including a very strong El Niño. Vertical wind shear was strong enough to disrupt convection in areas of disturbed weather so they could not develop further. The El Niño which affected this hurricane season extended into the 1983 Atlantic hurricane season. Higher than average values of African mineral dust during the most active portion of the hurricane season could have also suppressed tropical cyclone activity.

Starting in the 1982 season with Hurricane Debby, the Hurricane Hunter Aircraft (also known as P-3s) began running a new mission for NOAA's Hurricane Research Division. The mission was to drop dropsondes that deployed very-low Omega frequency signals. These signals were to estimate the dropsonde's motion compared to the aircraft in certain areas in a storm. The National Oceanic and Atmospheric Administration noted in retrospect that "The P-3s were not optimal for this experiment; nevertheless, the flights added an extra dimension to the art and science of hurricane forecasting", improving the accuracy of tropical cyclone forecast tracks by about 15%.

The season's activity was reflected with a cumulative accumulated cyclone energy (ACE) rating of 32, which is classified as "below normal". ACE is, broadly speaking, a measure of the power of the hurricane multiplied by the length of time it existed, so storms that last a long time, as well as particularly strong hurricanes, have high ACEs. ACE is only calculated for full advisories on tropical systems at or exceeding 34 knots (39 mph; 63 km/h) or tropical storm strength. Although officially, subtropical cyclones are excluded from the total, the figure above includes periods when fully tropical storms were in a subtropical phase.

== Systems ==
=== Hurricane Alberto ===
- Category 1 hurricane (SSHWS)
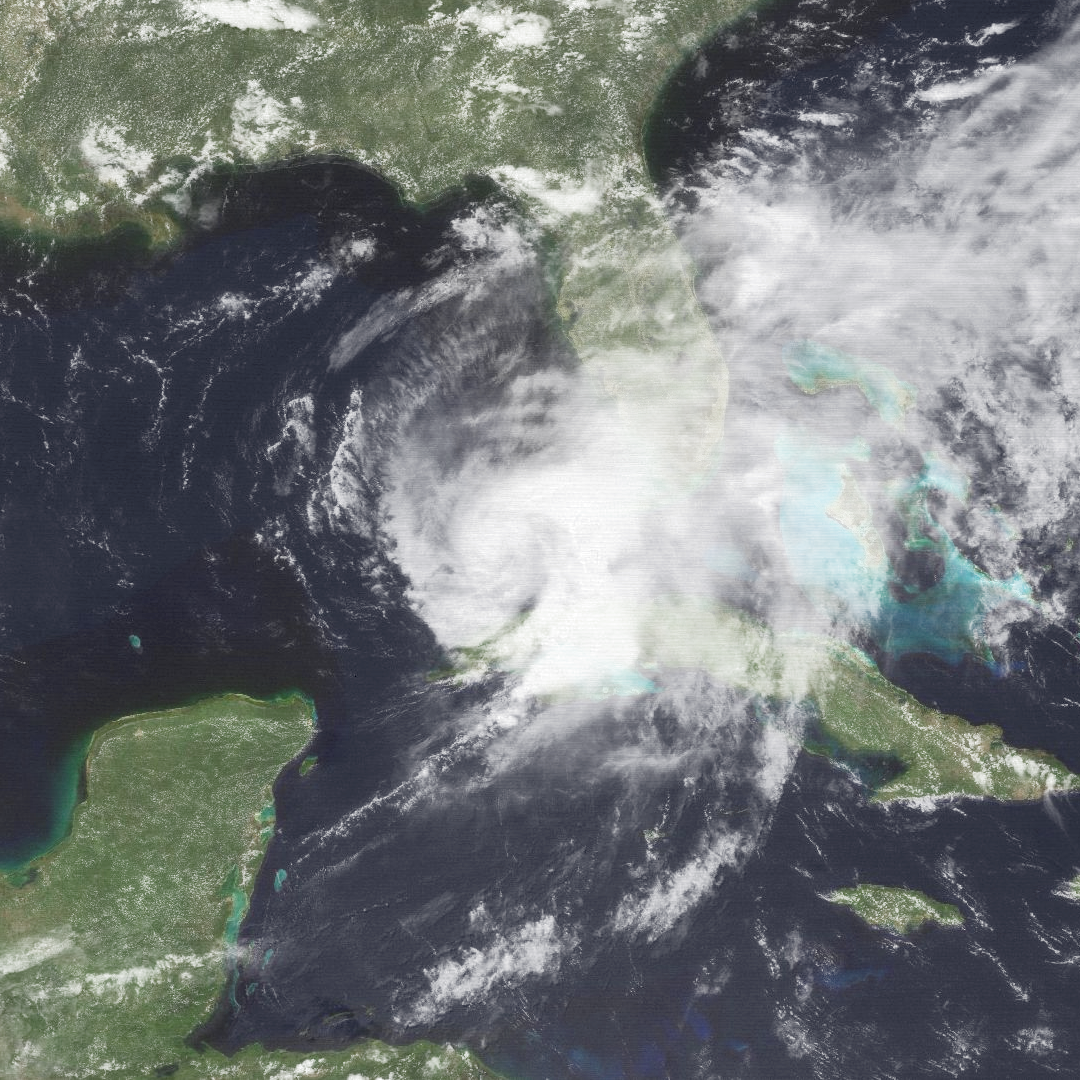
- Duration: June 2 – June 6
- Peak intensity: 85 mph (140 km/h) (1-min); 985 mbar (hPa)

In late May, a tropical disturbance developed over the northwestern portion of the Caribbean, which moved over the Yucatán Peninsula. The convection, or thunderstorms, organized around a low pressure area on June 1. Emerging into the Gulf of Mexico, the low developed into Tropical Depression One on June 2 about 40 mi (65 km) north-northwest of Cancún. It continued to the northeast and intensified off the northwest coast of Cuba. By 06:00 UTC on June 3, the depression intensified into Tropical Storm Alberto, based on a ship report, and it continued strengthening. At 15:45 UTC, Alberto attained hurricane status and soon reached peak winds of 85 mph (140 km/h), and a minimum pressure of 985 mbar (29.1 inHg), as observed by airplanes. At the time, the hurricane was located about 120 miles (190 km) west-southwest of Key West, Florida. Soon after reaching peak intensity, Alberto weakened due to strong upper-level wind shear, which displaced the convection. Early on June 4, it weakened to tropical storm status as the circulation turned sharply westward. On the next day, Alberto fell to tropical depression status while it drifted back to the northeast. The circulation dissipated on June 6 about 70 miles (110 km) off southwest Florida.

The rainbands of Alberto produced heavy rainfall and flash flooding across western Cuba. The rainfall peaked at 39.84 inches (1,012 mm), the fourth highest rainfall total in the country since 1963. More than 50,000 were forced to evacuate from the resulting floods, which were described as the worst flooding in the northwestern portion of the country since 1950. Overall, Alberto caused 23 deaths and an estimated $85 million in damage in Cuba. The floods damaged 8,745 houses in the country, leaving hundreds of people homeless. In Pinar del Río Province, 71 homes were destroyed, while 83 buildings collapsed in the capital city of Havana. Six factories in Havana Province received damage. The passage of Alberto left several districts in Havana without electricity, telegraph, telephone, and mail service. The military was deployed to rescue those trapped in flooded homes and also to remove fallen trees. Agricultural damage included about 250,000 downed banana trees and 400 drowned cattle.

The NHC issued a hurricane warning from the Dry Tortugas to Marathon in the Florida Keys, and along the southwestern coastline northward to Fort Myers. A hurricane watch was also issued from Marathon to Jupiter Inlet. Officials ordered mandatory evacuations along the southwest coast of Florida. More than 1,000 left their homes to stay in nine emergency shelters. Air Florida canceled all flights from Miami to Key West. Officials closed schools in Monroe County at midday on June 3 and also sent all nonessential city and county employees home. Gale-force winds and heavy rainfall were reported in the lower Florida Keys; Key West reported 6.25 inches (159 mm) during a 24-hour period, with the maximum reported winds at a land station being 70 mph (110 km/h) in the Dry Tortugas. Rainfall peaked at 16.47 inches (418 mm) at Tavernier. Alberto spawned three tornadoes and a waterspout in the Florida Keys, one of which at Stock Island which damaged several boats. One of the three tornadoes picked up a moving car and lightly injured the driver. Another knocked down two telephone poles on the Overseas Highway, which resulted in an hour traffic delay. Damage from the tornadoes totaled US$275,000.

=== Subtropical Storm One ===
- Subtropical storm (SSHWS)
- Duration: June 18 – June 20
- Peak intensity: 70 mph (110 km/h) (1-min); 984 mbar (hPa)

On June 15, a tropical disturbance moved across the northwest Caribbean Sea and onto the Yucatán Peninsula, where it interacted with an upper-level trough. The system produced a low pressure area that moved northeast into the Gulf of Mexico. A reconnaissance flight on June 17 reported that there were multiple transient circulations at the surface, but no well-defined center. By the next day, a surface circulation developed. At 00:00 UTC on June 18, a subtropical depression formed about 285 mi (460 km) west-southwest of Naples, Florida. Twelve hours later, the system intensified into a subtropical storm, and shortly thereafter it made landfall near Homosassa, Florida. Moving quickly northeastward, the subtropical storm crossed the peninsula in only about four hours and emerged into the Atlantic from the First Coast. Late on June 18, sustained winds associated with the storm peaked at 70 mph (110 km/h). The system crossed the Outer Banks of North Carolina on the following day, although the circulation became large and distorted. Paralleling the coast of Nova Scotia on June 20, the storm's minimum pressure fell to 984 mbar (29.1 inHg), shortly before becoming extratropical about 100 mi (160 km) south of Saint Pierre and Miquelon.

The storm produced heavy rainfall over Cuba, peaking at 28.66 inches (728 mm) were recorded. Rains in Florida peaked at 10.72 in (272 mm) in DeSoto County. The storm killed three people in Florida. A Brevard County woman died when a canoe overturned, and an Orange County child was killed when he was swept into a drainage ditch. A tornado destroyed a mobile home, killing a man in Hendry County. It was one of 12 tornadoes across the state, including two that were rated F2 on the Fujita Scale. Damage in Florida totaled $10 million (1982 USD), including 25 homes that were destroyed. In Arcadia, 130 families were evacuated after the Peace River rose significantly. Some buildings, boats, and marinas from Naples to the Tampa Bay area suffered damage. From Naples to the Tampa Bay area, high tides and waves caused floods, beach erosion, and damage to coastal structures and buildings. Outside of Florida, rainfall reached as far north as Virginia. Wind gusts reached 66 miles per hour (106 km/h) at the Oak Island Coast Guard Station. High waves sank a fishing trawler off Cape Fear, North Carolina, but the crew was rescued by the United States Coast Guard. Tides 2 to 3 ft (0.61 to 0.91 m) above normal caused flooding in the Carolinas.

=== Tropical Storm Beryl ===
- Tropical storm (SSHWS)
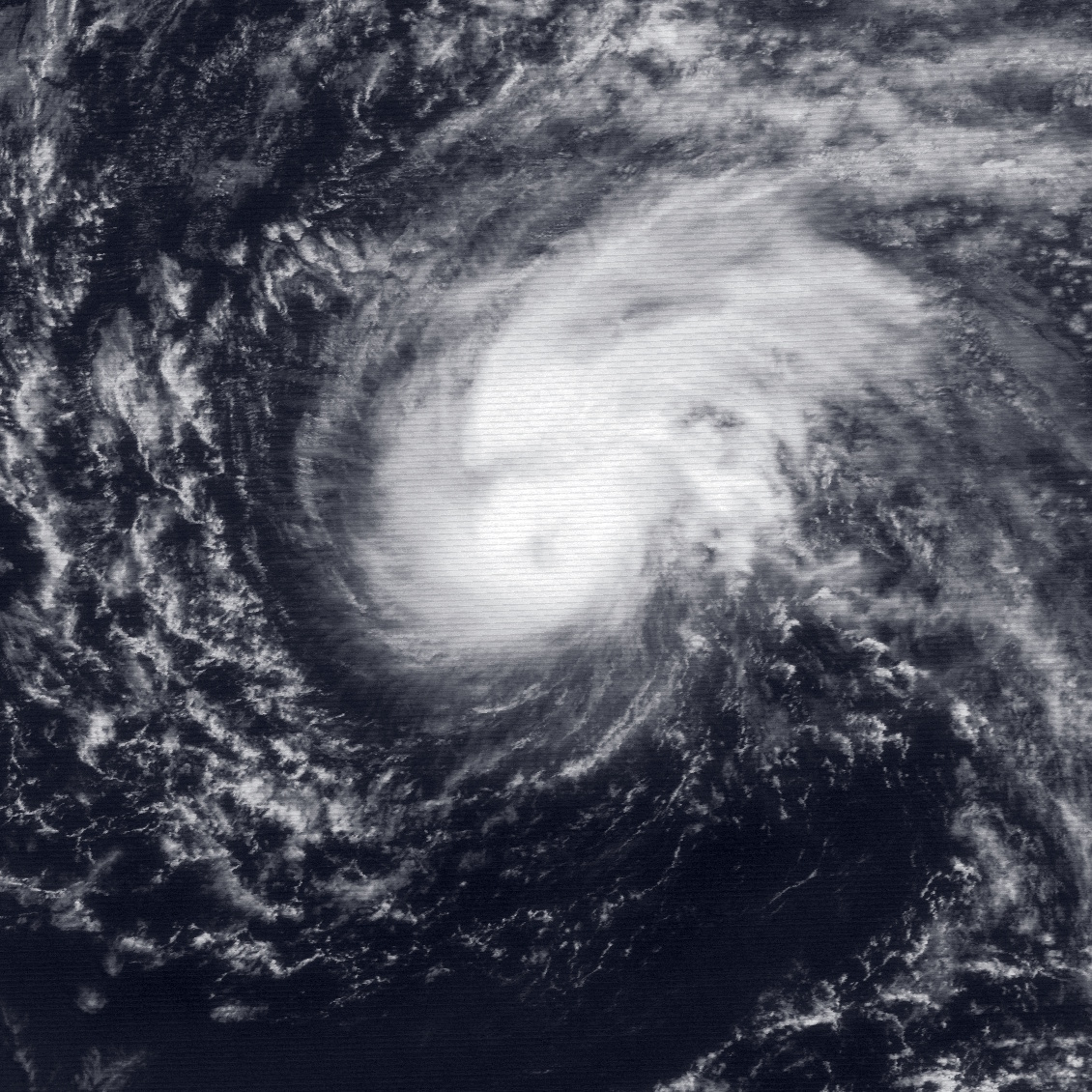
- Duration: August 28 – September 6
- Peak intensity: 70 mph (110 km/h) (1-min); 988 mbar (hPa)

A tropical wave exited western Africa on August 27, and continued to the west-northwest. It developed into Tropical Depression Two early on August 28, which quickly strengthened into Tropical Storm Beryl. Early on August 29, Beryl passed about 35 mi (55 km) south of the island of Brava. After passing by the Cape Verde Islands, Beryl strengthened further, and it developed an eye feature on August 31. The NHC estimated peak winds of 70 mph (110 km/h) and a minimum pressure of 988 millibars (29.2 inHg). Soon after the storm peaked, strong wind shear stripped the convection from the center. Beryl weakened to a tropical depression on September 2, after its circulation became exposed. Although it produced gale-force winds in squall lines, Beryl failed to restrengthen, and it dissipated on September 6.

Beryl produced heavy rains and gusty winds on the Cabo Verde Islands. The storm rendered approximately 2,100 people homeless and caused about $3 million in damage. Additionally, at least 3 people died and another 122 others suffered injuries. In the period after the storm's passage, the United States provided humanitarian aid and economic assistance to the country, helping the archipelago to reverse the effects of Beryl.

=== Tropical Depression Three ===
- Tropical depression (SSHWS)
- Duration: September 6 – September 9
- Peak intensity: 35 mph (55 km/h) (1-min); 1012 mbar (hPa)

This system formed about 525 mi (845 km) east of the Lesser Antilles on September 6 and to the southeast of Tropical Storm Beryl. Due to unfavorable conditions, the National Hurricane Center (NHC) did not expect the cyclone to intensify significantly. The depression failed to strengthen beyond maximum sustained winds of 35 mph (55 km/h) and moved northwestward to west-northwestward until dissipating about 380 mi (610 km) north of Puerto Rico on September 9.

=== Tropical Storm Chris ===
- Tropical storm (SSHWS)
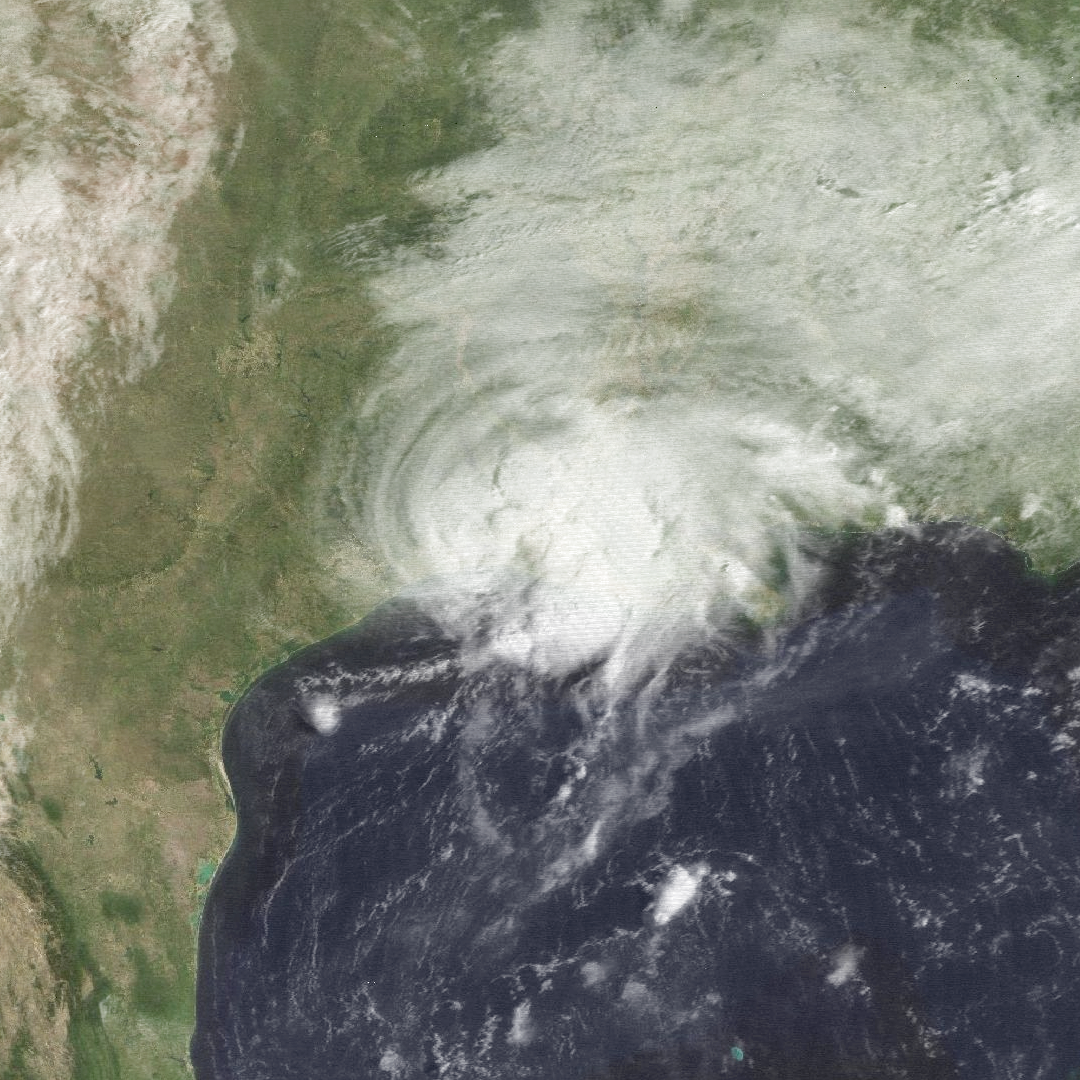
- Duration: September 9 – September 12
- Peak intensity: 65 mph (100 km/h) (1-min); 994 mbar (hPa)

An upper-low pressure system formed in the Gulf of Mexico on September 6, with the circulation heading westward. On September 8, a surface low pressure area formed. Early the next day, it developed into a subtropical depression. Over the next 24 hours, the low began acquiring tropical characteristics, mainly from developing deep convection on its north and east sides. Early on September 10, it transitioned into a tropical depression. Soon after, it strengthened into Tropical Storm Chris. A large trough over the Southwestern United States turned the storm northward. On September 11, Chris made landfall near Sabine Pass, Texas, with peak winds of 65 mph (100 km/h). Its minimum pressure was 994 mbar (29.4 inHg). Chris weakened quickly into a tropical depression, before dissipating over Arkansas on September 13.

Prior to Chris making landfall, thousands of people evacuated from southern Louisiana, including offshore oil workers. The storm produced heavy rainfall along the gulf coast, peaking at 16 in (410 mm) in Delhi, Louisiana. The storm spawned nine tornadoes, of which four were F2 or stronger on the Fujita scale. In Louisiana, two of the tornadoes collectively destroyed 16 buildings and damaged 7 others. A tornado in Mississippi damaged several homes and businesses in Cleveland, injuring four people. Another tornado overturned a mobile home in Eden. Several boats in the Gulf of Mexico sustained heavy damage, and a boat sank southeast of Sabine Pass. In Texas, a restaurant was damaged, and there were numerous power outages and flooded roads. In Louisiana, the storm produced 4 and 7 feet (1.2 and 2.1 m) high tides, causing coastal and street flooding. Farther inland, the storm's rains produced river flooding in Tennessee and Kentucky.

=== Hurricane Debby ===
- Category 4 hurricane (SSHWS)
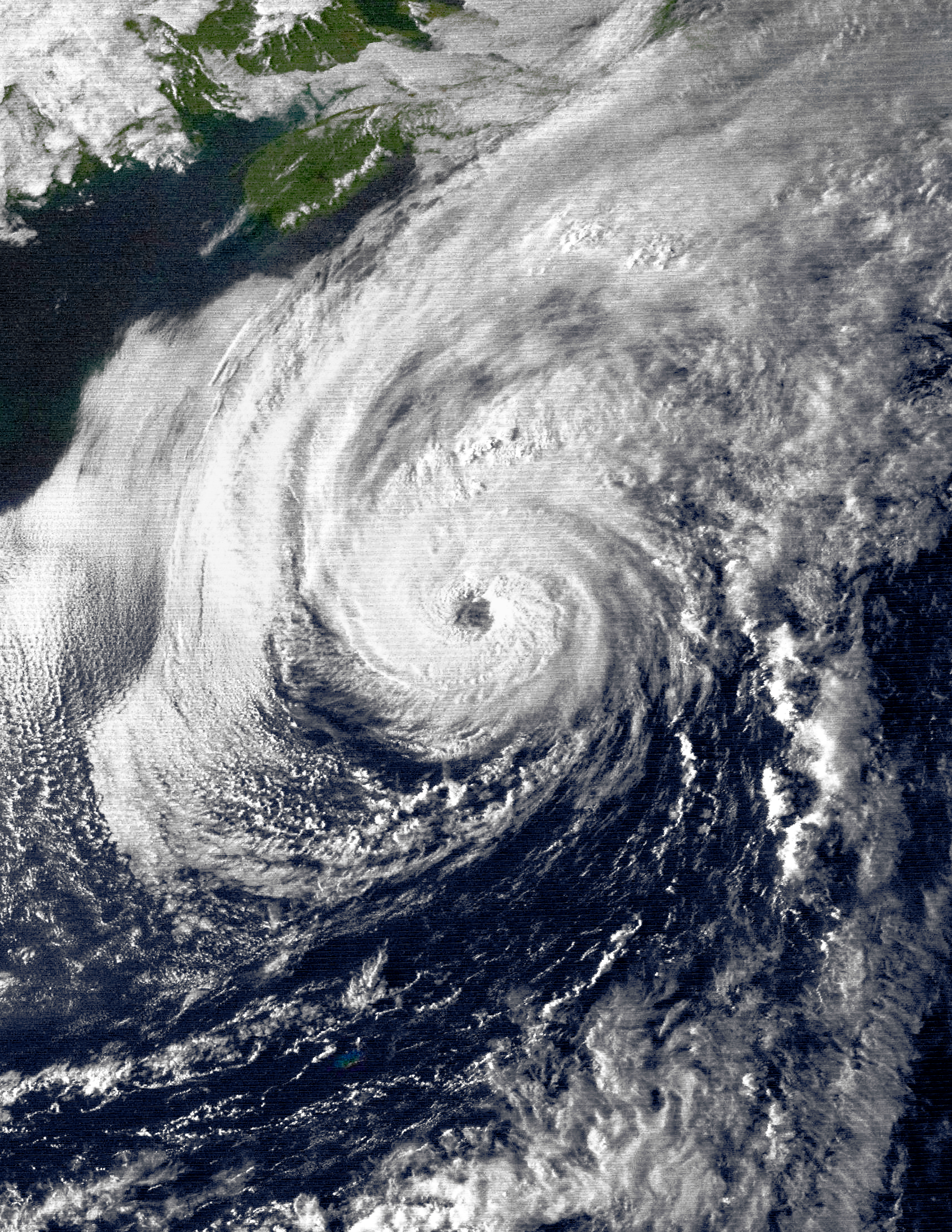
- Duration: September 13 – September 20
- Peak intensity: 130 mph (215 km/h) (1-min); 950 mbar (hPa)

A tropical wave exited western Africa on September 3, and continued westward. On September 11, the wave moved across the Lesser Antilles, and slowly became more organized amid more favorable conditions. On September 13, a tropical depression formed near the Dominican Republic. Moving northwest, it strengthened into Tropical Storm Debby a day later. An approaching trough turned the storm to the northeast. On September 14, Debby strengthened into a hurricane. Two days later, it passed about 80 miles (130 km) west of Bermuda. Due to the influence of another trough, Debby became nearly stationary before accelerating to the northeast. Around 00:00 UTC on September 18, it strengthened to reach peak winds of 130 mph (215 km/h), making it a Category 4 on the Saffir-Simpson scale; Debby also had a minimum pressure of 950 mbar (28 inHg), making it the strongest storm of the season. Debby weakened thereafter, and it passed roughly 30 to 40 mi (48 to 64 km) south of Cape Race, Newfoundland as a Category 2 hurricane. The storm accelerated and weakened to a tropical storm on September 20 over the colder waters of the north Atlantic. Later that day, Debby transitioned into an extratropical cyclone about 365 mi (585 km) west of Ireland, and merged with a strong non-tropical system developing over British Isles. The non-tropical storm re-intensified over Ireland and later crossed Scandinavia, reaching northern Finland on September 22.

The precursor to Debby dropped heavy rainfall across Puerto Rico, peaking at 12.86 in (327 mm) in Penuelas. The rains caused river flooding and landslides. One person died after a car entered an overflowing stream. Floodwaters entered some businesses and homes in Guayanilla, forcing about 600 people to evacuate. Strong winds also downed trees and damaged crops on the island. On Bermuda, wind gusts approached 70 mph (110 km/h), which caused minor power outages and knocked down trees. The threat of the hurricane led to thousands of tourists flying away from the island. The United States Navy removed its 700 personnel on Bermuda's Air Force Base, placing them in a gymnasium nearby. Offshore Newfoundland, oil rigs were evacuated, and a science expedition off Grand Banks was discontinued. Debby also produced light rainfall and gale-force winds in Newfoundland. The extratropical storm that absorbed Debby, also named Storm Mauri, produced a storm surge that killed two people in Finland. Wind gusts over 100 mph (160 km/h) knocked down widespread areas of forests.

=== Tropical Depression Seven ===
- Tropical depression (SSHWS)
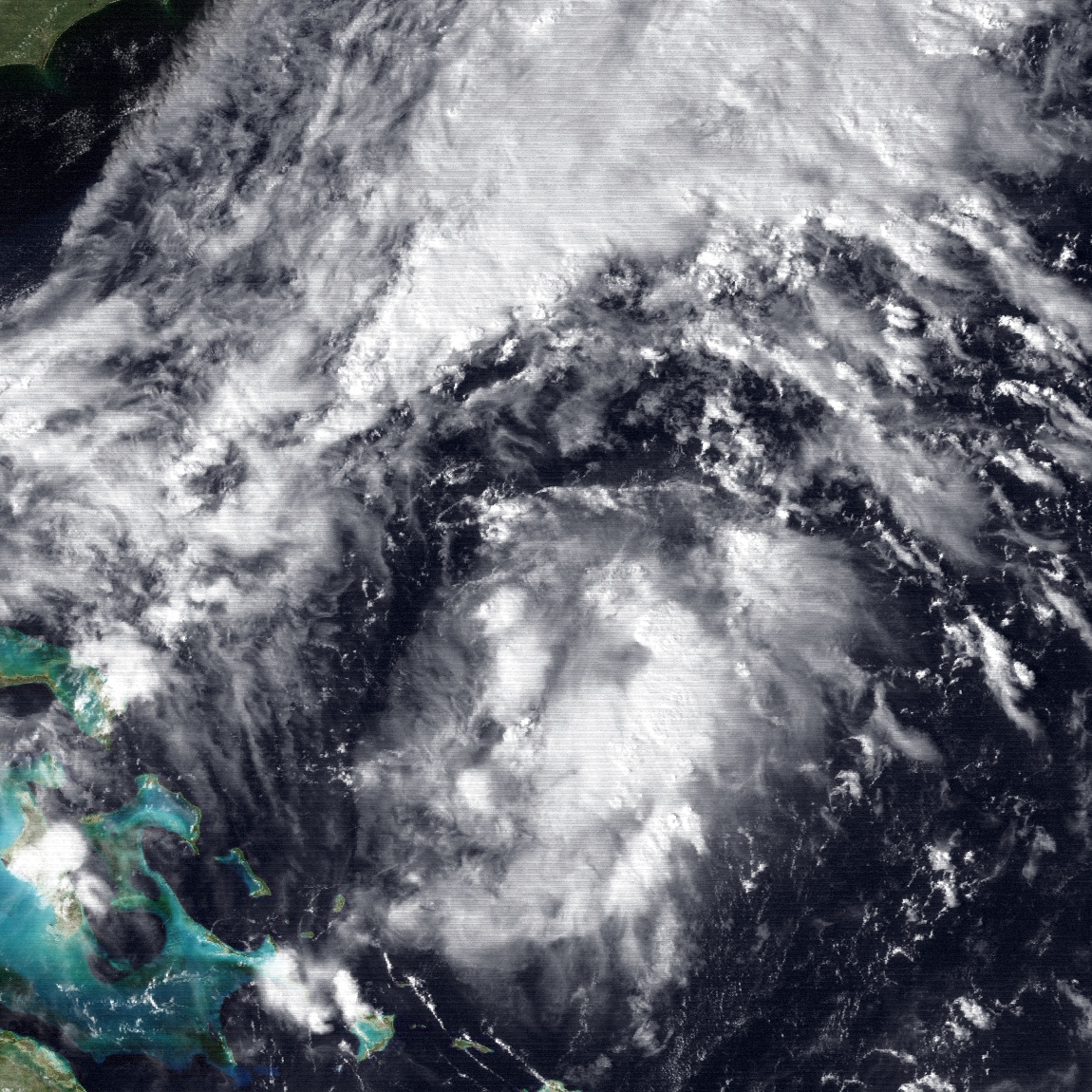
- Duration: September 24 – September 27
- Peak intensity: 35 mph (55 km/h) (1-min); 1007 mbar (hPa)

The remnant area of disturbed weather from Tropical Depression Six continued moving west-northwest into the southwest north Atlantic. A tropical depression formed from this area 275 mi (445 km) west of Bermuda on September 25. The system recurved off the north and northeast, dissipating in north Atlantic shipping lanes southeast of Nova Scotia on September 27.

=== Tropical Storm Ernesto ===
- Tropical storm (SSHWS)
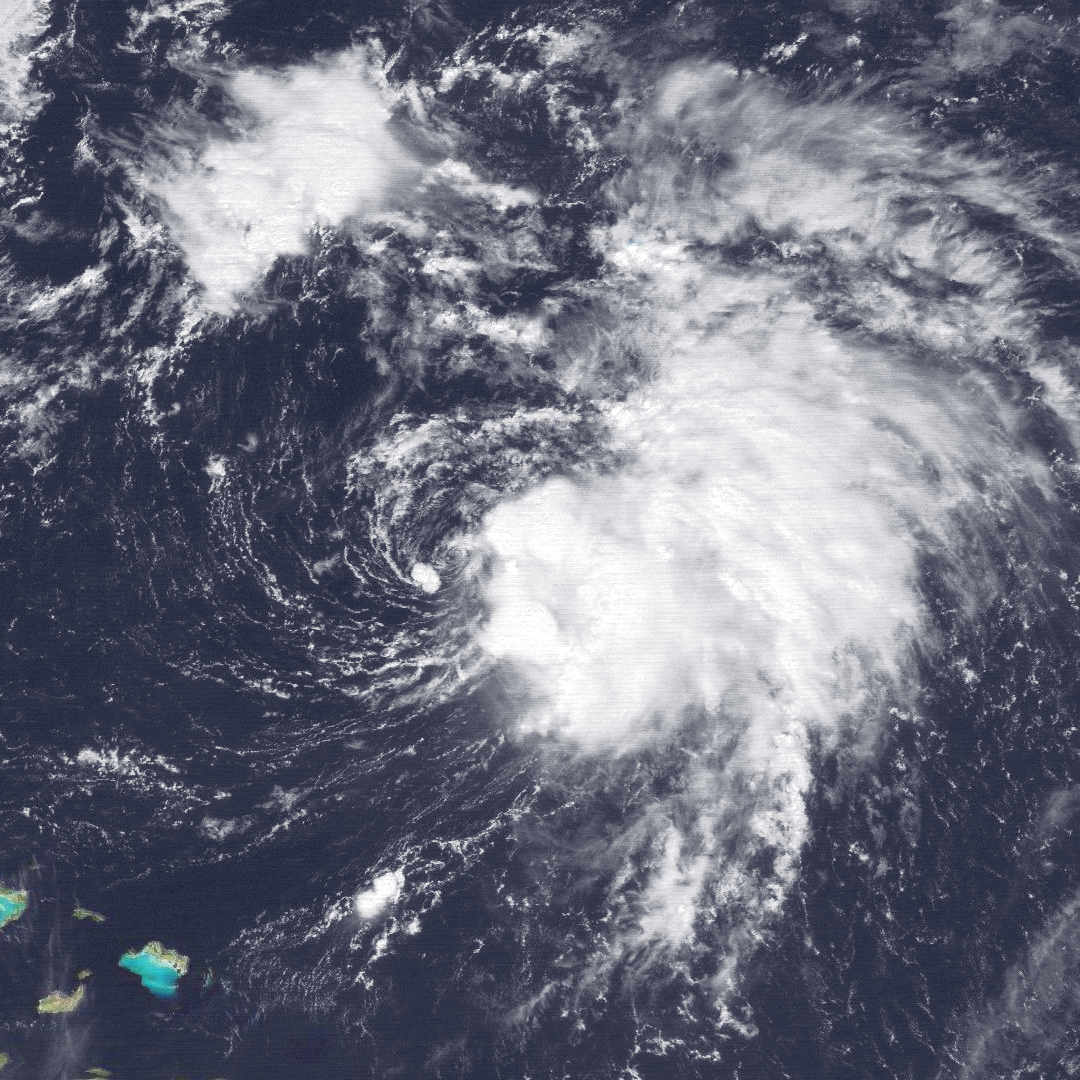
- Duration: September 30 – October 3
- Peak intensity: 70 mph (110 km/h) (1-min); 997 mbar (hPa)

A tropical wave emerged into the Atlantic from the west coast of Africa on September 23. The west side of the wave expanded and was designated Tropical Depression Eight on September 30 approximately 440 mi (710 km) north of Puerto Rico. The depression intensified and curved sharply northeastward on October 1. A reconnaissance flight found 40 mph (65 km/h) winds with a pressure of 1,003 mbar (29.62 inHg) and the depression was given the name Ernesto. A second reconnaissance flight on October 1 recorded sustained winds of 71 mph (114 km/h) with a pressure of 997 mbar (29.44 inHg). However, on October 2, Ernesto rapidly weakened and by the next day, the cyclone became unidentifiable after merging with an extratropical low about 390 mi (630 km) east of Bermuda.

=== Other system ===
A system operationally known as Tropical Depression Six was tracked from September 16 to 20 in the central Main Development Region, however it was later removed fom the Atlantic HURDAT database.

== Storm names ==
The following list of names was used for storms that formed in the North Atlantic in 1982. Each name used this season was utilized for the first time, except for the name Debby as it had previously been used on the old naming lists, but spelled as Debbie. No names were retired from this list following the season, thus it was used again for the 1988 season.

- Alberto
- Beryl
- Chris
- Debby
- Ernesto
- Florence (unused)
- Gilbert (unused)
- Helene (unused)
- Isaac (unused)
- Joan (unused)
- Keith (unused)
- Leslie (unused)
- Michael (unused)
- Nadine (unused)
- Oscar (unused)
- Patty (unused)
- Rafael (unused)
- Sandy (unused)
- Tony (unused)
- Valerie (unused)
- William (unused)

== Season effects ==
This is a table of all of the storms that formed in the 1982 Atlantic hurricane season. It includes their name, duration, peak classification, and intensities, areas affected, damage, and death totals. Deaths in parentheses are additional and indirect (an example of an indirect death would be a traffic accident), but were still related to that storm. Damage and deaths include totals while the storm was extratropical, a wave, or a low, and all of the damage figures are in 1982 USD.

Saffir–Simpson scale
TD	TS	C1	C2	C3	C4	C5

1982 North Atlantic tropical cyclone season statistics
Storm name	Dates active	Storm category at peak intensity	Max 1-min wind mph (km/h)	Min. press. (mbar)	Areas affected	Damage (US$)	Deaths	Ref(s).
Alberto	June 2–6	Category 1 hurricane	85 mph (135 km/h)	985 hPa (29.09 inHg)	Cuba, Florida	$85 million	23	
One	June 18–20	Subtropical storm	70 mph (115 km/h)	984 hPa (29.06 inHg)	Southeastern United States, Atlantic Canada	$10 million	3	
Beryl	August 28 – September 6	Tropical storm	70 mph (115 km/h)	989 hPa (29.21 inHg)	Cape Verde Islands	$3 million	3	
Three	September 6–9	Tropical depression	35 mph (55 km/h)	1012 hPa (29.88 inHg)	None	None	None	
Chris	September 9–12	Tropical storm	65 mph (105 km/h)	994 hPa (29.35 inHg)	Southern United States	$2 million	None	
Debby	September 13–20	Category 4 hurricane	130 mph (210 km/h)	950 hPa (28.05 inHg)	Puerto Rico, Hispaniola, Bermuda, Newfoundland	Minimal	(1)	
Seven	September 24–27	Tropical depression	35 mph (55 km/h)	1007 hPa (29.74 inHg)	None	None	None	
Ernesto	September 30 – October 3	Tropical storm	70 mph (115 km/h)	997 hPa (29.44 inHg)	None	None	None	
Season aggregates
8 systems	June 2 – October 3		130 mph (210 km/h)	950 hPa (28.05 inHg)		$100 million	30	

== See also ==
- 1982 Pacific hurricane season
- 1982 Pacific typhoon season
- 1982 North Indian Ocean cyclone season
- Australian cyclone seasons: 1981–82, 1982–83
- South Pacific cyclone seasons: 1981–82, 1982–83
- South-West Indian Ocean cyclone seasons: 1981–82, 1982–83
- South Atlantic tropical cyclone
- Mediterranean tropical-like cyclone
