= 1981 Atlantic hurricane season =

- Season summary map

Seasonal boundaries
- First system formed: April 6, 1981
- Last system dissipated: November 17, 1981

Strongest storm
- Name: Harvey
  - Maximum winds: 130 mph (215 km/h) (1-minute sustained)
  - Lowest pressure: 946 mbar (hPa; 27.94 inHg)

Seasonal statistics
- Total depressions: 22
- Total storms: 12
- Hurricanes: 7
- Major hurricanes (Cat. 3+): 3
- Total fatalities: 14 total
- Total damage: $88.7 million (1981 USD)

Related articles
- Timeline of the 1981 Atlantic hurricane season; 1981 Pacific hurricane season; 1981 Pacific typhoon season; 1981 North Indian Ocean cyclone season

The 1981 Atlantic hurricane season featured direct or indirect impacts from nearly all of its 12 tropical or subtropical storms. Overall, the season was fairly active, with 22 tropical depressions, 12 of which became named storms. 7 of those reached hurricane status and a further 3 intensified into major hurricanes. The season officially began on June 1, 1981, and lasted until November 30, 1981. These dates conventionally delimit the period of each year when most tropical cyclones form in the Atlantic basin. However, tropical cyclogenesis can occur before these dates, as demonstrated with the development of two tropical depressions in April and Tropical Storm Arlene in May. At least one tropical cyclone formed in each month between April and November, with the final system, Subtropical Storm Three, becoming extratropical on November 17, 1981.

Although many tropical cyclones impacted land, few caused significant damage. Tropical Depression Eight was the most devastating storm of the season, causing five fatalities and $56.2 million in damage due to flooding over southeast Texas in August. During the same month, Hurricane Dennis produced heavy rainfall across Florida's Miami metropolitan area and in parts of southeastern North Carolina, killing three people and leaving about $28.5 million in damage. Tropical Depression Two, Tropical Storm Bret, and Hurricane Katrina also resulted in fatalities. Collectively, the Atlantic tropical cyclones of this season were responsible for about $88.7 million in damage and 14 deaths.

== Seasonal summary ==
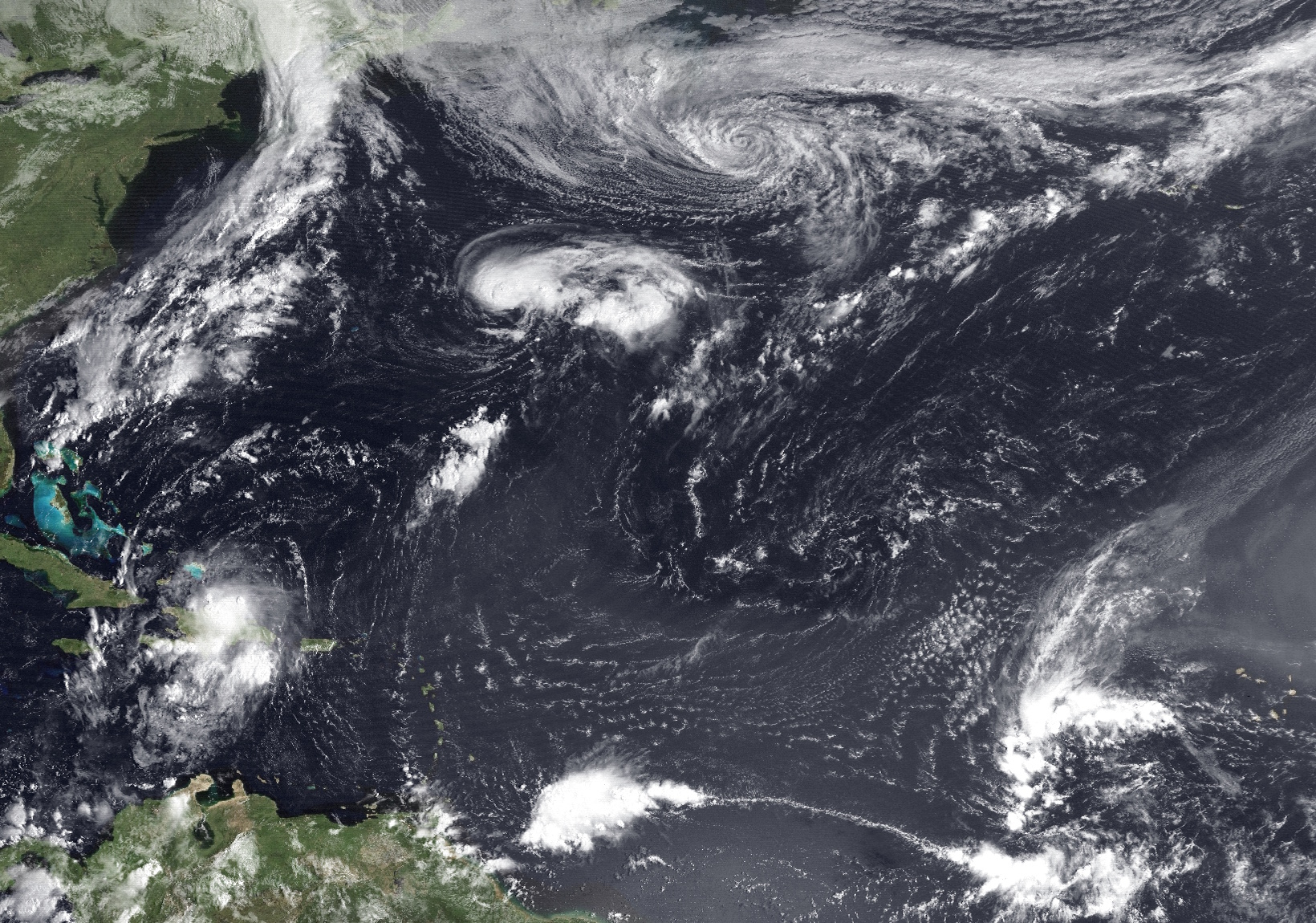
Satellite image on September 9, 1981, of Emily (top-center), Floyd (top-left), Gert (bottom-left), and formative stage of Harvey (bottom-right)

The 1981 Atlantic hurricane season officially began on June 1 and ended on November 30. The season was high in activity, with 22 cyclones, 12 of which intensified into tropical or subtropical storms. Of those, seven intensified into a hurricane, while three strengthened into a major hurricane. This activity exceeded the National Oceanic and Atmospheric Administration (NOAA)'s 1950-2005 average of 11 named storms, 6 hurricanes, and 2 major hurricanes. Although most of the systems made landfall or otherwise impacted land, few caused extensive damage or fatalities. Collectively, the tropical cyclones of the 1981 Atlantic hurricane season caused about $88.7 million in damage and 14 deaths.

Tropical cyclogenesis began early, with two tropical depression forming in April, the first of which developing on April 6. Both tropical depressions were operationally unnumbered. Tropical Storm Arlene formed on May 6. The storm made landfall in Cuba two days later, before being absorbed later by a low. Tropical Depression Two moved out of the Gulf of Mexico into eastern Texas on June 5, producing localized rainfall amounts of 12 in (300 mm) and numerous tornadoes over Louisiana before recurving across the Southeast United States. Another previously unnumbered tropical depression formed over the Bay of Campeche later that month on June 17. It made landfall in Mexico south of Tampico before dissipating about two days later. Tropical Storm Bret formed as a subtropical low in the open Atlantic Ocean north of Bermuda on June 29, and made landfall in the Delmarva Peninsula.

The last of four previously unnumbered tropical depressions developed near Andros on July 2. It made landfall in southeast Florida and later in South Carolina before dissipating on July 4. Tropical Depression Four formed in the Gulf of Mexico on July 25, moving into Mexico the next day, and causing heavy rains in west Texas, Oklahoma, and Arkansas when its remnants moved into the United States. Tropical Storm Cindy formed on August 2 in the open Atlantic and became an extratropical cyclone on August 5. Hurricane Dennis formed on August 7 near South America. Dennis degenerated into a depression while making landfall in the Leeward Islands, but regained storm strength while over Cuba. Dennis moved near the southeast United States coastline from Florida to Virginia, briefly becoming a hurricane. Dennis weakened into a tropical storm and was declared an extratropical cyclone on August 22.

Tropical Depression Seven formed in mid-August and tracked through the Windward Islands before dissipating near Trinidad and Tobago. Tropical Depression Eight led to a significant flooding event between San Antonio and Houston on August 30 and August 31 while recurving through Texas into Louisiana. Hurricane Emily formed on September 1 southeast of Bermuda. Emily made a cyclonic loop as a tropical storm. Emily strengthened into a hurricane out in the North Atlantic Ocean and by September 12, was no longer identifiable. Hurricane Floyd was a Category 3 hurricane that grazed Bermuda, but no damage was reported. Hurricane Gert formed September 8, strengthened into a Category 2 hurricane, and followed the same track as Floyd, dissipating near the Azores. Hurricane Harvey became the strongest storm of the season, reaching Category 4 strength. Harvey never affected land, but ships reported tropical storm-force winds. Tropical Depression Thirteen brought gusts of tropical storm force to Bermuda in mid-to-late September. Hurricane Irene also stayed out at sea, reaching Category 3 strength before becoming extratropical in early October. The extratropical remnants of Irene made landfall in France.

Tropical Depression Fifteen was small and well-organized as it crossed the tropical Atlantic before weakening as it moved through the northeast Caribbean and southwest North Atlantic during late September and early October. Tropical Storm Jose was a short-lived storm forming out in the open Atlantic in late October. Jose never affected land and dissipated on November 1 near the Azores. Hurricane Katrina formed in the Caribbean Sea, and made landfall in Cuba after reaching hurricane strength. The final storm of the season, Subtropical Storm Three, formed in the Atlantic Ocean on November 12 and moved north, making landfall in Nova Scotia and becoming extratropical soon after.

The season's activity was reflected with an accumulated cyclone energy (ACE) rating of 100, which is classified as "near normal" by NOAA and is slightly higher than the 1951-2000 average of 93.2. ACE is a metric used to express the energy used by a tropical cyclone during its lifetime. Therefore, storms that last a long time, as well as particularly strong hurricanes, have high ACEs. It is only calculated for full advisories on tropical systems at or exceeding 39 mph (63 km/h), which is the threshold for tropical storm intensity.

== Systems ==
=== Tropical Storm Arlene ===
- Tropical storm (SSHWS)
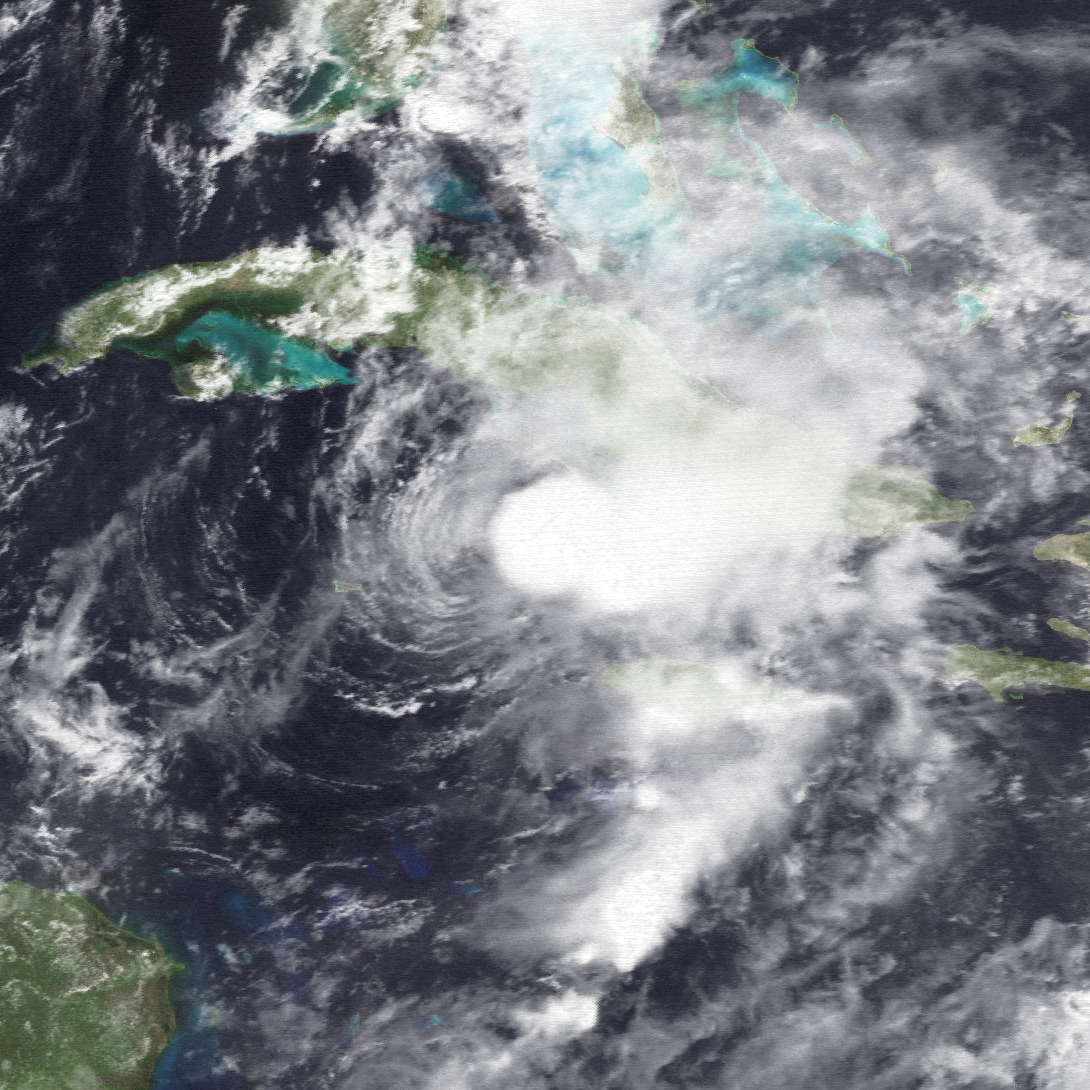
- Duration: May 6 – May 9
- Peak intensity: 60 mph (95 km/h) (1-min); 999 mbar (hPa)

An area of thunderstorms in the eastern Pacific Ocean crossed Central America into the western Caribbean, developing a low-level circulation on May 5 offshore Honduras. Convection organized enough that a tropical depression formed on May 6 near the Cayman Islands. It was a rare example of an Atlantic depression forming from a disturbance that originated in the eastern Pacific. Spiral rainbands developed around the center, and the depression intensified into Tropical Storm Arlene on May 7 while moving generally northeastward, steered by a ridge to its north. Arlene struck eastern Cuba early on May 8 with winds of 50 mph (85 km/h). Strong wind shear and Arlene's passage over land weakened the storm to a tropical depression and caused its circulation to become ill-defined. After an area of convection reformed, Arlene re-intensified after exiting Cuba, reaching winds of 60 mph (95 km/h) and a minimum pressure of 999 mbar (29.5 inHg) over the southeastern Bahamas, based on observations from Hurricane Hunters. Arlene soon weakened to a tropical depression again and was absorbed by an advancing trough on May 9. Late the next day, the combined systems reorganized and resembled having some subtropical characteristics, but it weakened further by May 11.

As Arlene was approaching its first landfall, the National Hurricane Center noted the potential for heavy rainfall in Jamaica, Cuba, and the Bahamas; small boats in those regions were advised to remain at harbor. Meanwhile, the government of the Bahamas issued storm warnings for the central and southeastern portion of its country. There were no reports of damage or casualties from Cuba or the Bahamas, and therefore storm affects were judged to have been minimal. Early in the duration of Arlene, Cayman Brac reported 46 mph (74 km/h) winds; later, peak winds in the Bahamas reached around 35 mph (55 km/h). Arlene was the only May tropical storm on record to affect the Cuban province of Camagüey, although its passage was mostly noticed in its disruption of sugar cane production.

=== Tropical Depression Two ===
- Tropical depression (SSHWS)
- Duration: June 3 – June 5
- Peak intensity: 35 mph (55 km/h) (1-min); 996 mbar (hPa)

A tropical depression formed in the Bay of Campeche on June 3. Classified as Tropical Depression Two, the system moved north-northwest, lured by a closed upper-cyclone over the southern Great Plains. Shortly before 12:00 UTC on June 5, the depression made landfall near Matagorda, Texas, with winds of 35 mph (55 km/h) . Surface observations indicate that the depression's barometric pressure at landfall ranged from 991 to 996 mbar (29.3 to 29.4 inHg). Although the depression dissipated later on June 5, its remnants quickly recurved through the Mississippi Valley, and deepened as it moved off the coast of the Mid-Atlantic states into the Atlantic on June 7.

The depression, in conjunction with an upper-level low, dropped heavy rainfall in the Greater Houston area, with a peak total of 15 in (380 mm) at Lake Anahuac. In Texas City, 1 to 6 in (25 to 152 mm) of water inside 16 homes forced the evacuation of their occupants, with at least 23 homes suffering water damage. Water also entered city hall. Some roads had roughly 18 in (460 mm) of standing water, stranding some motorists for hours. In Galveston, a tornado damaged forty homes and apartments, with severe damage to three homes and two apartment units. One business suffered major roof damage, while several cars were damaged at an auto dealership. The depression also spawned eight tornadoes in Louisiana. The most destructive tornado touched down in Rapides Parish, where it substantially damaged or destroyed thirty-eight cars at a dealership in Lecompte, severely damaged five homes and caused minor damage to four others, downed large trees, and tossed an 18-wheeler truck approximately 200 ft (61 m). Overall, the depression killed three people, two due to flooding and one from an associated tornado. At least $4 million in damage was caused by this depression.

=== Tropical Storm Bret ===
- Tropical storm (SSHWS)
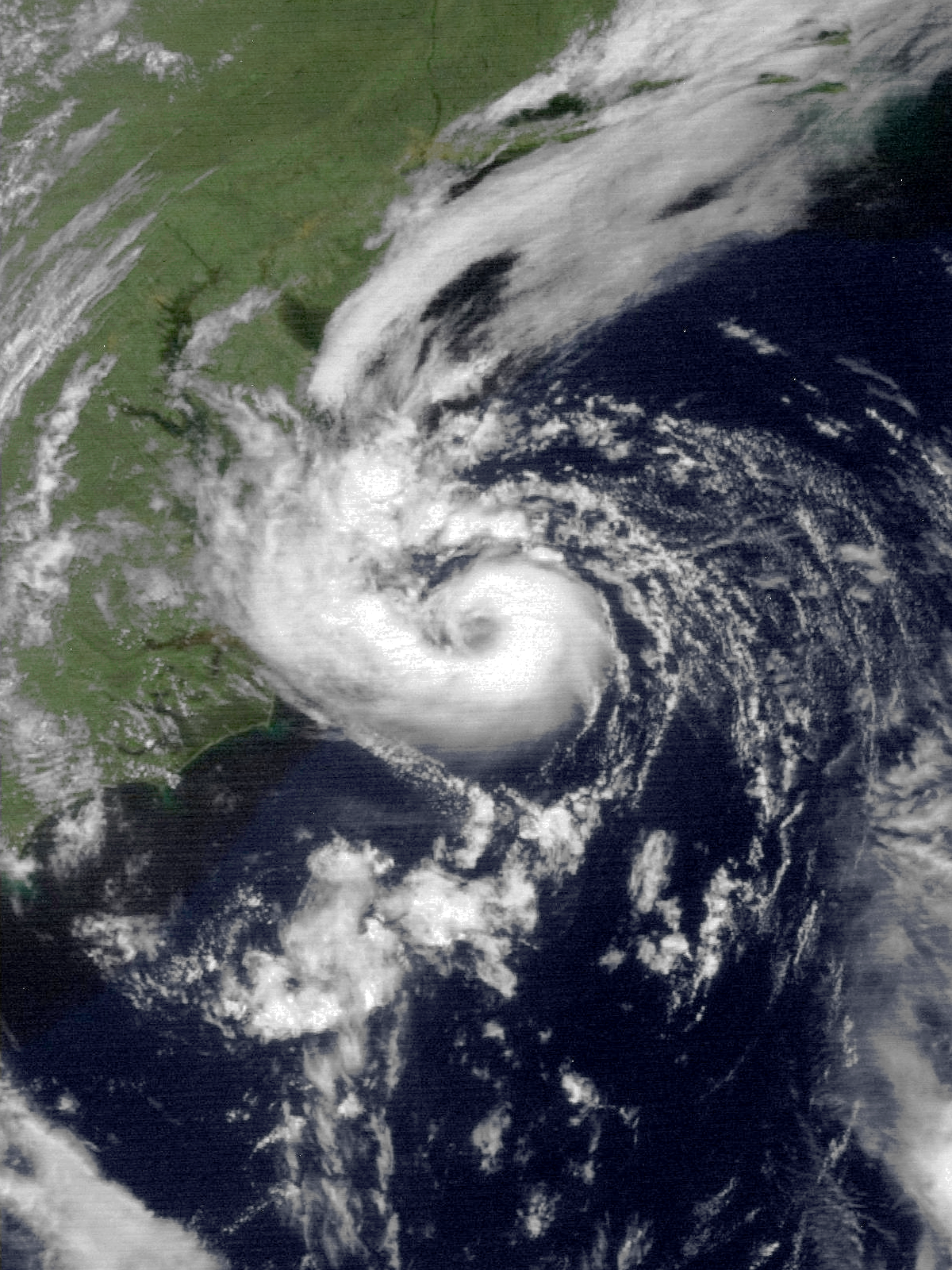
- Duration: June 29 – July 1
- Peak intensity: 70 mph (110 km/h) (1-min); 996 mbar (hPa)

A low-pressure area initially associated with a frontal system developed into a subtropical storm on June 29 while roughly 575 mi (925 km) east of Cape Hatteras, North Carolina. The system headed westward and transitioned into Tropical Storm Bret around 06:00 UTC on June 30. Bret attained its peak intensity six hours later with maximum sustained winds of 70 mph (110 km/h) and a minimum atmospheric pressure of 996 mbar (29.4 inHg). However, Bret rapidly weakened as it approached the Mid-Atlantic and deteriorated to a minimal tropical storm by the time it made landfall on the Delmarva Peninsula early on July 1. The cyclone dissipated over northern Virginia several hours later.

Rainfall amounts were light, with a narrow area of over 1 in (25 mm) of precipitation reported near its track and within the central Appalachians, while a peak total of 4.48 in (114 mm) was observed at Big Meadows, Virginia. Locally heavy rains in western Pennsylvania caused some basement and street flooding. No significant damage was reported, but one fatality occurred at Nags Head, North Carolina, due to riptides.

=== Tropical Depression Four ===
- Tropical depression (SSHWS)
- Duration: July 25 – July 26
- Peak intensity: 35 mph (55 km/h) (1-min); 1008 mbar (hPa)

In association with a tropical wave, a tropical disturbance formed over the Caribbean south of Cuba. As a disturbance crossed the Yucatán Peninsula, it interacted with an upper-level low-pressure area centered to the west. After emerging into the south-central Gulf of Mexico, the disturbance organized into a tropical depression early on July 25. The depression moved west-northwest into northeast Mexico on July 26 with winds of 35 mph (55 km/h) before its surface circulation dissipated. Heavy rains fell across western Texas, Oklahoma, and Arkansas when the remains of this system interacted with a stationary front across the southern Plains between July 28 and July 30. Precipitation peaked at 9.61 in (244 mm) near Sallisaw.

=== Tropical Storm Cindy ===
- Tropical storm (SSHWS)
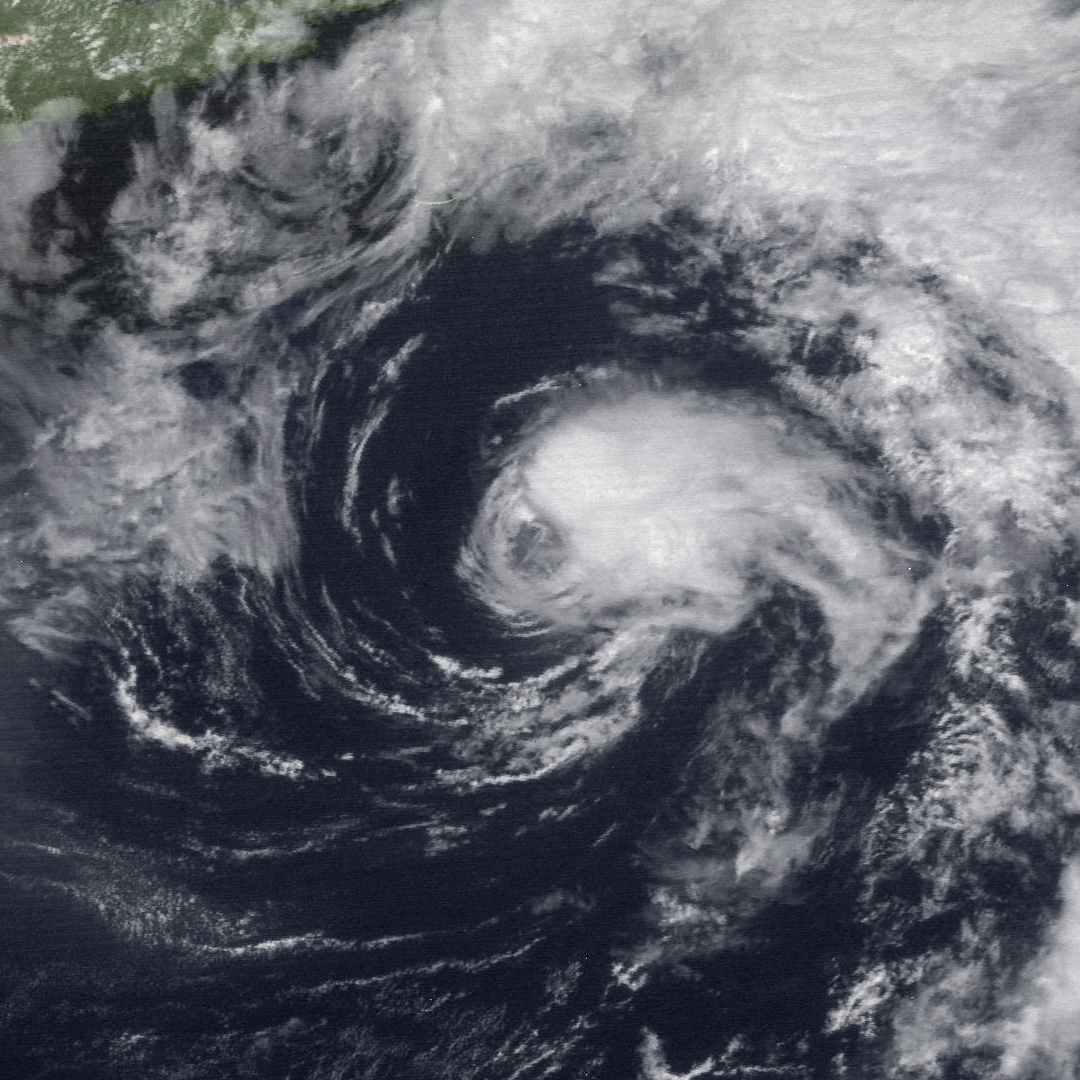
- Duration: August 2 – August 5
- Peak intensity: 60 mph (95 km/h) (1-min); 1002 mbar (hPa)

A cold front moved offshore North Carolina on July 30. An area of disturbed weather along the tail-end of the front subsequently began to develop cyclonic banding, resulting in the formation of a subtropical depression late on August 2 about 310 mi (500 km) northwest of Bermuda. After acquiring more central dense overcast, the subtropical depression transitioned into a tropical depression around 12:00 UTC on the following day. Soon, the depression also intensified into Tropical Storm Cindy late on August 3 about midway between Bermuda and Nova Scotia. Cindy tracked east-northeast until becoming extratropical on August 5 as it moved over colder sea surface temperatures to the southeast of Newfoundland.

=== Hurricane Dennis ===
- Category 1 hurricane (SSHWS)
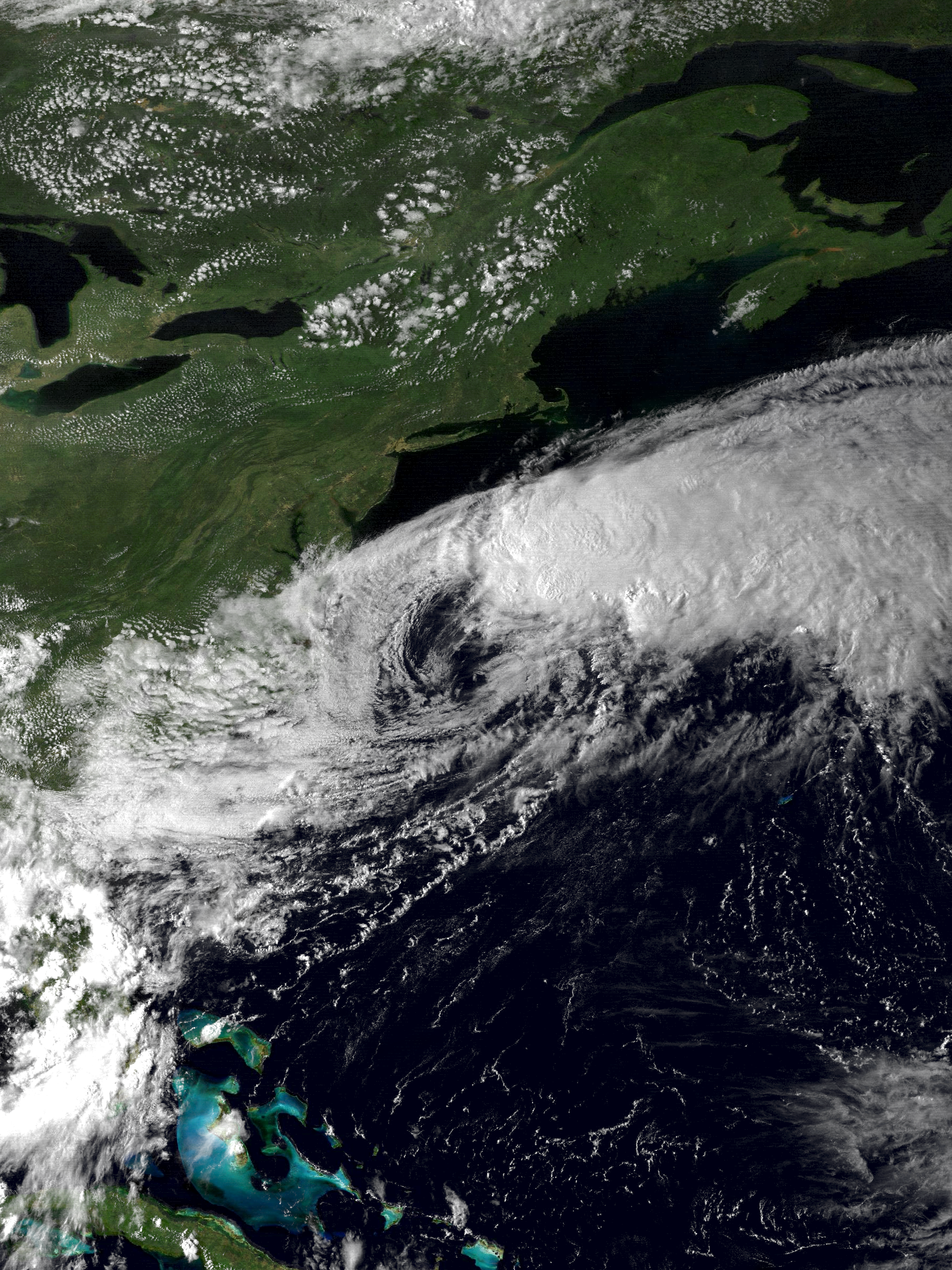
- Duration: August 7 – August 21
- Peak intensity: 80 mph (130 km/h) (1-min); 995 mbar (hPa)

A tropical wave emerged into the Atlantic from the west coast of Africa on August 5. Two days later, the wave developed into a tropical depression well south of the Cabo Verde Islands. The depression intensified into a tropical storm early on August 8. However, Dennis then encountered strong wind shear, causing the storm to weaken to a tropical depression on August 11. After crossing the Windward Islands on August 12, Dennis entered the Caribbean but degenerated into a tropical wave early the following day. The wave became a tropical depression again late on August 15 while approaching Cuba. Dennis reintensified into a tropical storm around 00:00 UTC on August 16, just prior to landfall near Playa Girón, Matanzas Province. The cyclone emerged into the Straits of Florida hours later, before striking the Florida Keys and then mainland Monroe County early the next day. It drifted across Florida, reaching the Atlantic near Cape Canaveral on August 19. Dennis continued to intensify and made landfall near Emerald Isle, North Carolina, but moved east-northeastward and soon tracked offshore. Late on August 20, Dennis deepened into a hurricane with winds of 80 mph (130 km/h), before weakening to a tropical storm over colder waters on August 21. Dennis became extratropical northeast of Bermuda early on August 22 and persisted until being absorbed by a frontal system on August 26.

In the Caribbean, Dennis dropped heavy precipitation on some islands, including Martinique, Saint Lucia, the Virgin Islands, and the Greater Antilles. Flooding in Jamaica left at least 50 people homeless. In Florida, heavy rain fell in many areas to the east of the storm's path. Much of southeast Florida received at least 7 in (180 mm) of precipitation, while over 25.56 in (649 mm) of rain fell in Homestead. Nearly all of Dade County was flooded to the south of Kendall Drive. Many businesses and homes in cities such as Homestead and Florida City suffered water damage. However, the worst damage was incurred to crops, which experienced a loss of over $17.26 million. One death and nearly $18.5 million in damage occurred in Florida. Farther north, Dennis also caused flooding in the Carolinas, inundating many streets and causing crop damage in both states. A weather-related traffic accident in South Carolina resulted in two fatalities. Twenty families in Columbus County, North Carolina, evacuated after the Waccamaw River overran its banks. Overall, Dennis left caused three deaths and about $28.5 million in damage.

=== Tropical Depression Seven ===
- Tropical depression (SSHWS)
- Duration: August 18 – August 21
- Peak intensity: 35 mph (55 km/h) (1-min); 1007 mbar (hPa)

This system developed over the tropical Atlantic Ocean on August 18, moving westward and then southwestward towards the Windward Islands. The depression dissipated east of Trinidad and Tobago late on August 21.

=== Tropical Depression Eight ===
- Tropical depression (SSHWS)
- Duration: August 26 – August 30
- Peak intensity: 35 mph (55 km/h) (1-min); 1004 mbar (hPa)

Tropical Depression Eight developed from a tropical disturbance over the Bay of Campeche on August 26. Moving northwestward, the cyclone failed to intensify into a tropical storm before making landfall in the Mexican state of Tamaulipas to the north of Tampico on August 28, with winds of 35 mph (55 km/h). After moving inland, the depression curved north-northwestward before degenerating into a surface low-pressure area near the Mexico–United States border on August 29. The remnants moved eastward across Texas and entered Louisiana before dissipating on September 1.

Although the system was only a surface low upon reaching Texas, a large thunderstorm complex developed near its center on August 29. This resulted in heavy rainfall across southeastern Texas, with a peak total of 21 in (530 mm) in Pine Springs in Fayette County, with much of that falling in only about six hours. One of the hardest hit areas was Lavaca County. At least 15 streets in downtown Hallettsville were flooded, damaging hundreds of cars, 150 to 200 homes, 75 businesses, and a few local government buildings. Five people were killed by floodwaters in Shiner. Throughout Lavaca County, more than 286 homes were damaged or destroyed, 17 bridges and several roads were washed out, and hundreds of head of cattle were drowned. The depression spawned 14 tornadoes, one of which caused extensive damage in the Galveston area. Overall, the depression left more than $56.2 million in damage.

=== Hurricane Emily ===
- Category 1 hurricane (SSHWS)
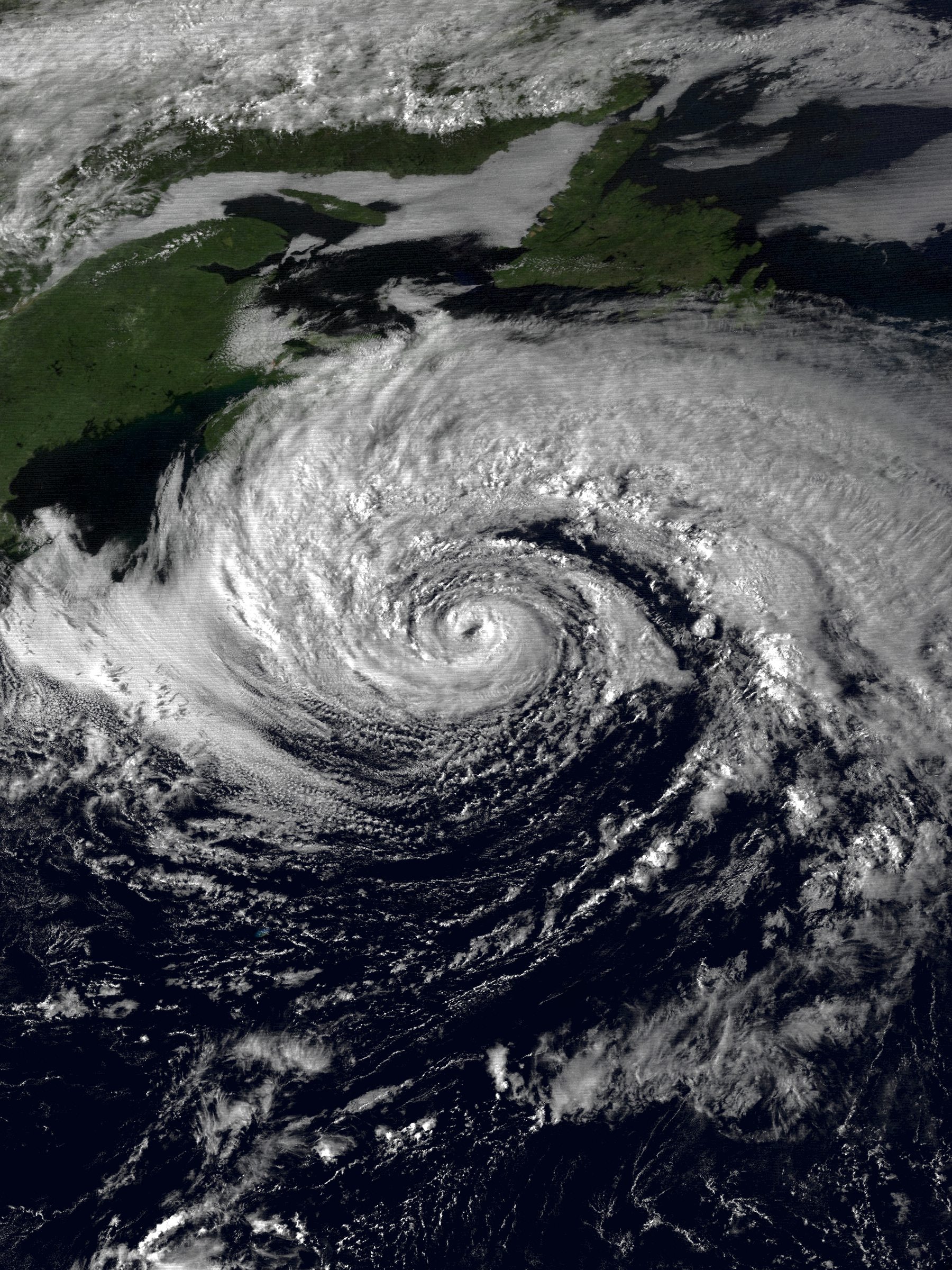
- Duration: August 31 – September 11
- Peak intensity: 90 mph (150 km/h) (1-min); 966 mbar (hPa)

In late August, a low-pressure system developed over the southwestern Atlantic from a dissipating frontal zone. Showers and thunderstorms organized over the next few days, enough to become a subtropical depression at 12:00 UTC on August 31 while centered about 340 mi (545 km) northeast of the Abaco Islands in the Bahamas. The subtropical depression intensified into a subtropical storm and then transitioned into Tropical Storm Emily on the following day. Emily moved northeast, passing close to Bermuda on September 2. A large high-pressure system caused the storm to execute a cyclone loop on September 3 and September 4, before resuming a northeast motion. Early on the latter date, Emily intensified into a hurricane and then reached its peak intensity late on September 5, with sustained winds of 90 mph (150 km/h) and a minimum pressure of 966 mbar (28.5 inHg). A major blocking pattern and its associated weak upper-level westerly winds caused Emily to move in a more eastward direction. The cyclone weakened to a tropical storm on September 8 and degenerated into a low-pressure area on September 11 about 635 mi (1,020 km) east-southeast of Cape Race, Newfoundland, which quickly became unidentifiable.

Although Emily passed close to Bermuda on September 2, Kindley Air Force Base only observed sustained winds of 23 to 29 mph (37 to 47 km/h) and a barometric pressure of 993 mbar (29.3 inHg). Emily, along with a high-pressure system, caused beach erosion across the East Coast of the United States.

=== Hurricane Floyd ===
- Category 3 hurricane (SSHWS)
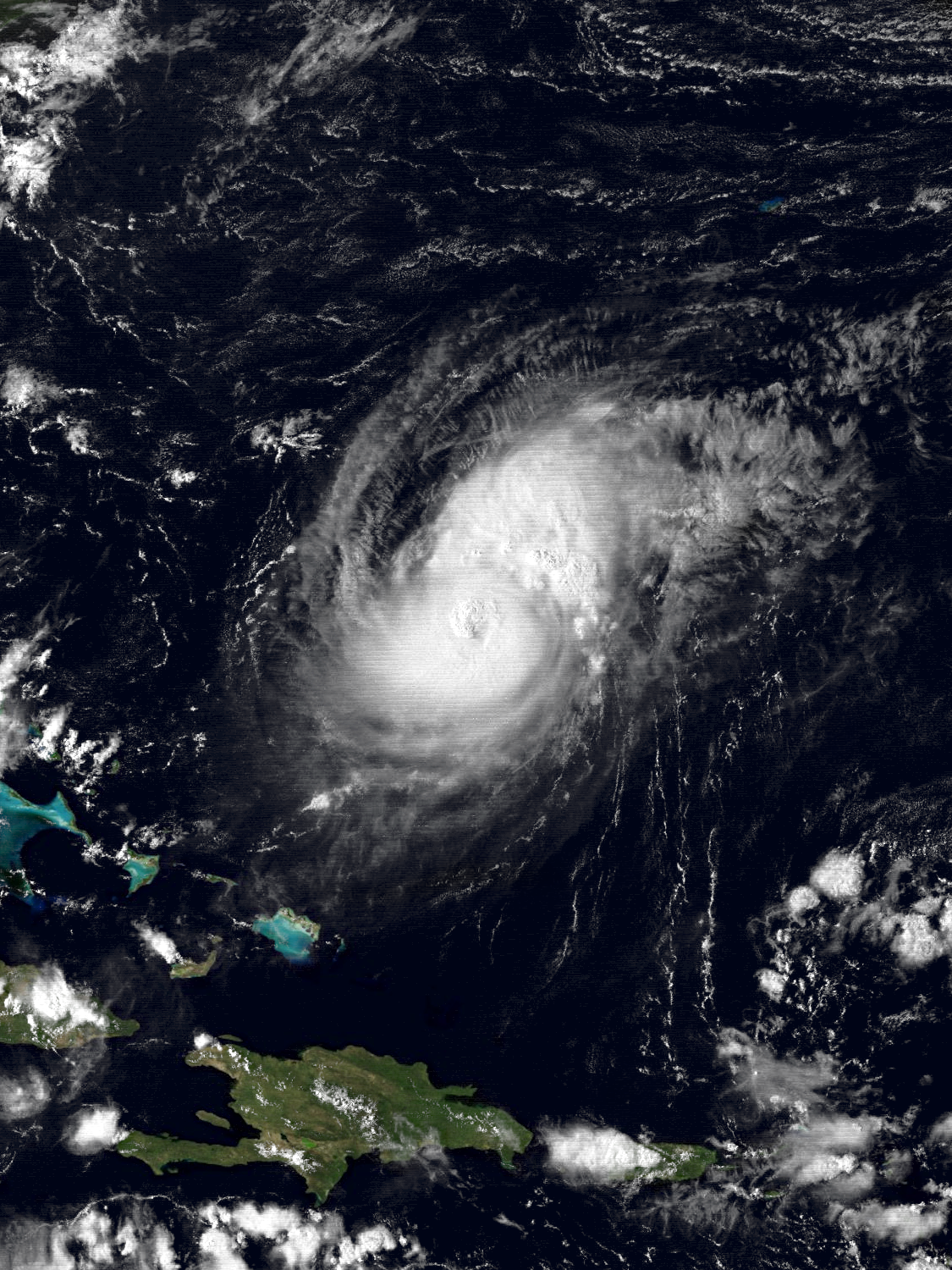
- Duration: September 3 – September 12
- Peak intensity: 115 mph (185 km/h) (1-min); 975 mbar (hPa)

A tropical wave became a tropical disturbance east of the Lesser Antilles on August 31. At 12:00 UTC on September 3, the disturbance developed into a tropical depression approximately 60 mi (95 km) east of Guadeloupe. After passing near or over several Leeward Islands in a northwestward trajectory, the depression intensified into Tropical Storm Floyd late on September 4 and then reached hurricane status about 24 hours later. Because Emily eroded the western side of a high-pressure ridge, Floyd turned northward on September 6. The cyclone strengthened into a major hurricane on the following day and peaked as a Category 3 with winds of 115 mph (185 km/h) and a minimum pressure of 975 mbar (28.8 inHg) as it turned northeastward. However, Floyd soon encountered strong wind shear and fell to tropical storm intensity later on September 8 while located near Bermuda. The storm then moved generally eastward before turning northeastward on September 10. Floyd became unidentifiable on September 12 about 135 mi (215 km) northwest of the northwesternmost islands of the Azores.

As the depression moved northwest across the Leeward Islands, it caused heavy rain. The highest precipitation reported was 5.7 inches (140 mm) at Antigua. On Bermuda, residents and officials boarded-up windows, tightened moors of vessels, closed schools on September 8, and canceled many commercial flights. Rains and winds up to 60 mph (95 km/h) impacted the island, but damage was minor.

=== Hurricane Gert ===
- Category 2 hurricane (SSHWS)
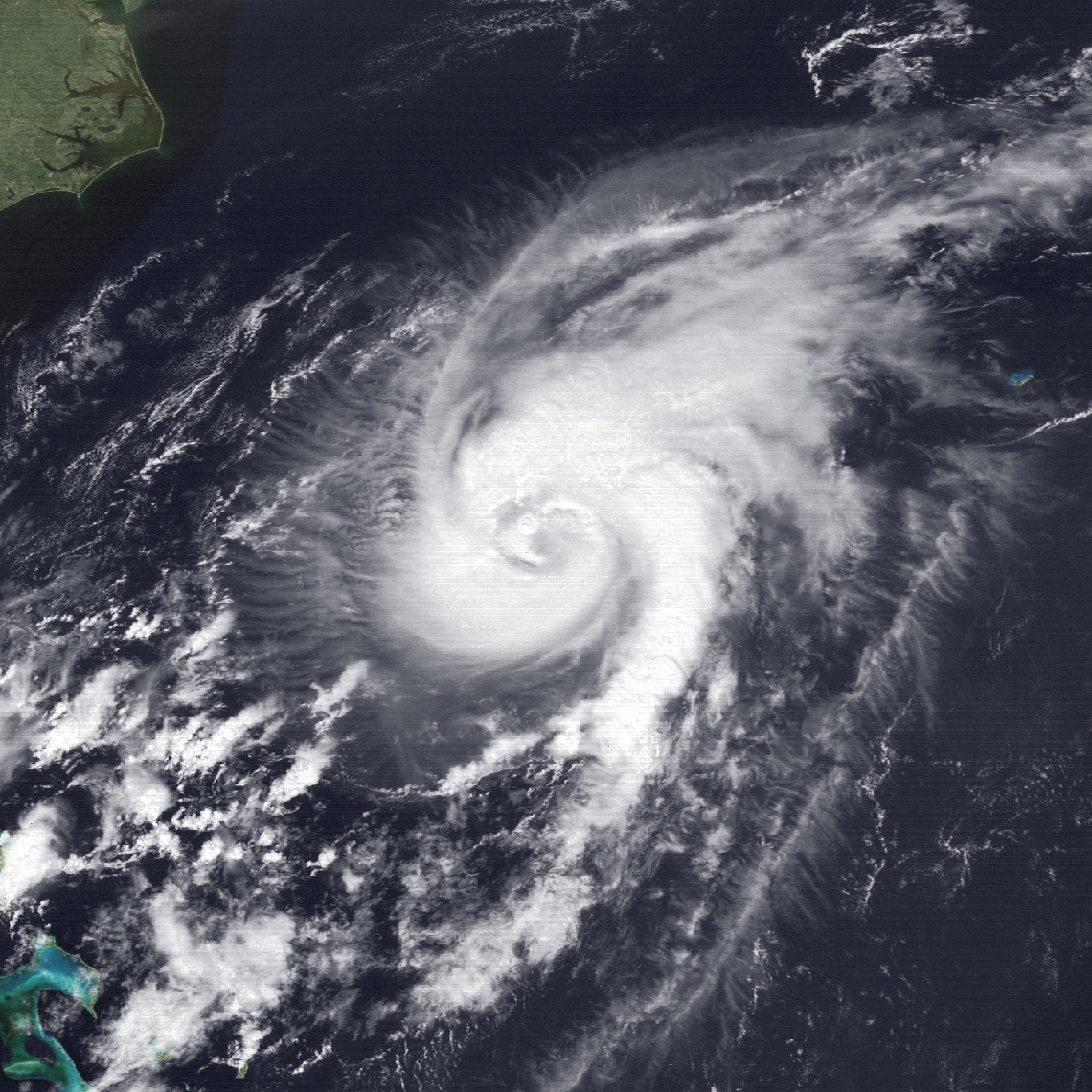
- Duration: September 7 – September 15
- Peak intensity: 105 mph (165 km/h) (1-min); 988 mbar (hPa)

A tropical wave exited western Africa on September 1, gradually developing a concentrated area of convection. Early on September 7, satellite imagery indicated that Tropical Depression Eleven formed about 400 mi (645 km) east of the Leeward Islands. The depression intensified into Tropical Storm Gert on the following day. The newly upgraded storm passed between Dominica and Guadeloupe and continued to intensify, making landfall on southeastern Puerto Rico with winds of 60 mph (97 km/h) late on September 8. After emerging into the Atlantic, Gert weakened while passing just north of the Dominican Republic. It restrengthened while turning northward near the Bahamas, becoming a hurricane on September 10. Midday on September 11, Gert peaked with winds of 105 mph (169 km/h) and a minimum pressure of 988 mbar (988 hPa; 29.2 inHg). The hurricane turned northeastward and weakened over cooler waters, passing about 100 mi (160 km) north of Bermuda on September 12 as a tropical storm. On September 14, Gert weakened further to tropical depression status, dissipating the next day.

While passing through the Leeward Islands, Gert dropped moderate rainfall of 5.85 in (149 mm) on St. Thomas. Winds gusted to 50 mph (80 km/h) on the island. In Puerto Rico, rainfall peaked at 6.02 in (153 mm) in the municipality of Maricao, flooding some highways. Several towns on the southside of the island lost electricity during the storm due to downed power lines. Gale warnings were issued for the Turks and Caicos Islands and later the southeastern Bahamas, and light rainfall occurred in the region, reaching 3.20 in (81 mm) on the island of San Salvador. Winds were light in Bermuda.

=== Hurricane Harvey ===
- Category 4 hurricane (SSHWS)
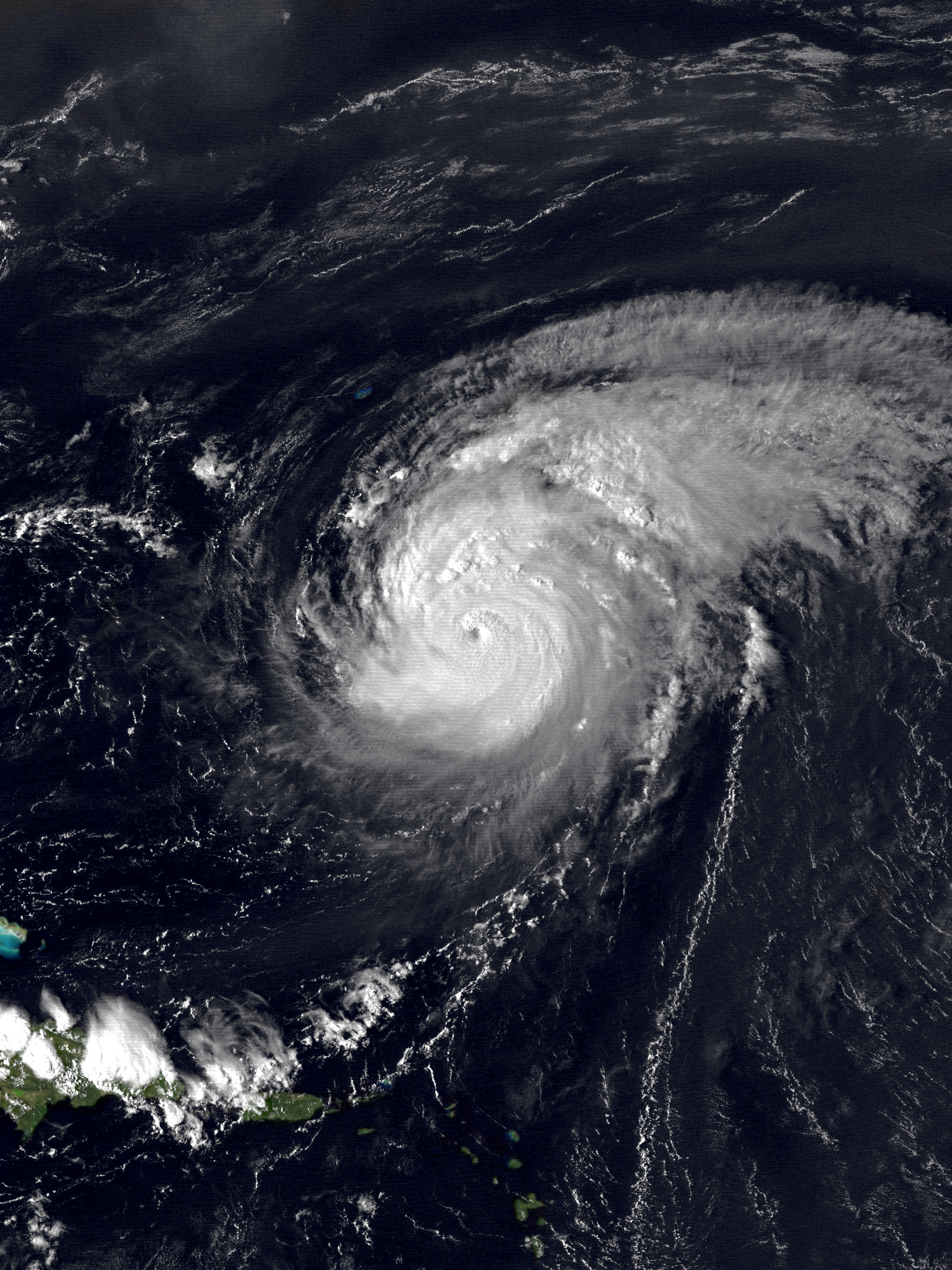
- Duration: September 11 – September 19
- Peak intensity: 130 mph (215 km/h) (1-min); 946 mbar (hPa)

A tropical wave that emerged into the Atlantic from the west coast of Africa on September 7 developed into a tropical depression roughly 700 mi (1,125 km) east of Barbados on September 11. Moving northwestward, the depression intensified into Tropical Storm Harvey at 18:00 UTC on September 12 and reached hurricane status just six hours later. On September 14, Harvey curved north-northwestward around a weakness in the Azores High and strengthened significantly, becoming a major hurricane that day. The cyclone reached its peak intensity on September 15, as a Category 4 hurricane with winds of 130 mph (215 km/h) and a minimum pressure of 946 mbar (27.9 inHg). Harvey soon weakened below Category 4 hurricane status while turning northeastward. The westerlies caused the cyclone to gradually turn eastward. Harvey weakened to a tropical storm on September 18 and then transitioned into an extratropical cyclone on the following day about 515 mi (830 km) southwest of the northwesternmost islands of the Azores. The remnants of Harvey were observed for several days on satellite imagery.

=== Hurricane Irene ===
- Category 3 hurricane (SSHWS)
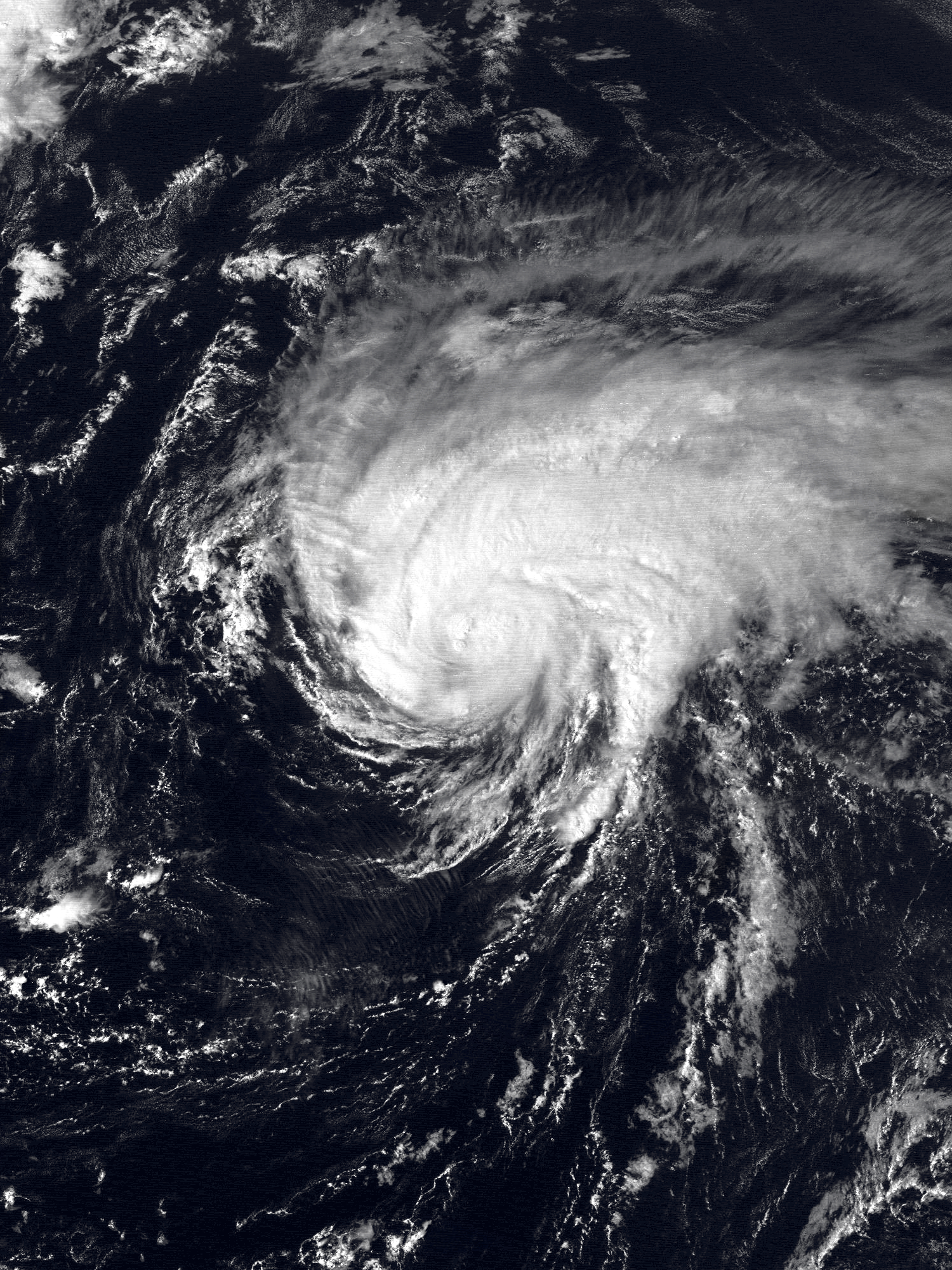
- Duration: September 21 – October 2
- Peak intensity: 120 mph (195 km/h) (1-min); 959 mbar (hPa)

Satellite imagery detected a tropical disturbance off the coast of Africa on September 19. By September 21, the disturbance developed into a tropical depression approximately 520 mi (835 km) west-southwest of the Cabo Verde Islands, although deep convection remained unconcentrated from the center for three more days. The depression intensified into Tropical Storm Irene on September 23. The storm tracked northwest under the influence of two high pressure areas to the northeast and northwest and an upper-level trough, becoming a hurricane on September 25. Irene then began to curve eastward as it gradually strengthened. On September 28, Irene strengthened into a Category 3 hurricane and reached its peak intensity with maximum sustained winds of 120 mph (195 km/h) and a minimum barometric pressure of 959 mbar (28.3 inHg). Accelerating northeastward due to the upper-level trough, Irene then gradually weakened, falling below hurricane strength on October 1. Early on October 2, Irene transitioned into an extratropical cyclone while located approximately 460 mi (740 km) north of the Azores. The remaining extratropical storm moved over France on October 3.

=== Tropical Depression Fifteen ===
- Tropical depression (SSHWS)
- Duration: September 27 – October 4
- Peak intensity: 35 mph (55 km/h) (1-min); 1010 mbar (hPa)

This tropical depression formed southwest of the Cabo Verde Islands on September 27, and tracked through the deep tropics before weakening as it moved over the Leeward Islands late on September 30. Heavy rains occurred at Guadeloupe as the system passed by the island. while light precipitation fell on Puerto Rico and the United States Virgin Islands, peaking at 2.29 in (58 mm) near Peñuelas. The depression then recurved to the south and east of Bermuda late on October 4.

=== Tropical Storm Jose ===
- Tropical storm (SSHWS)
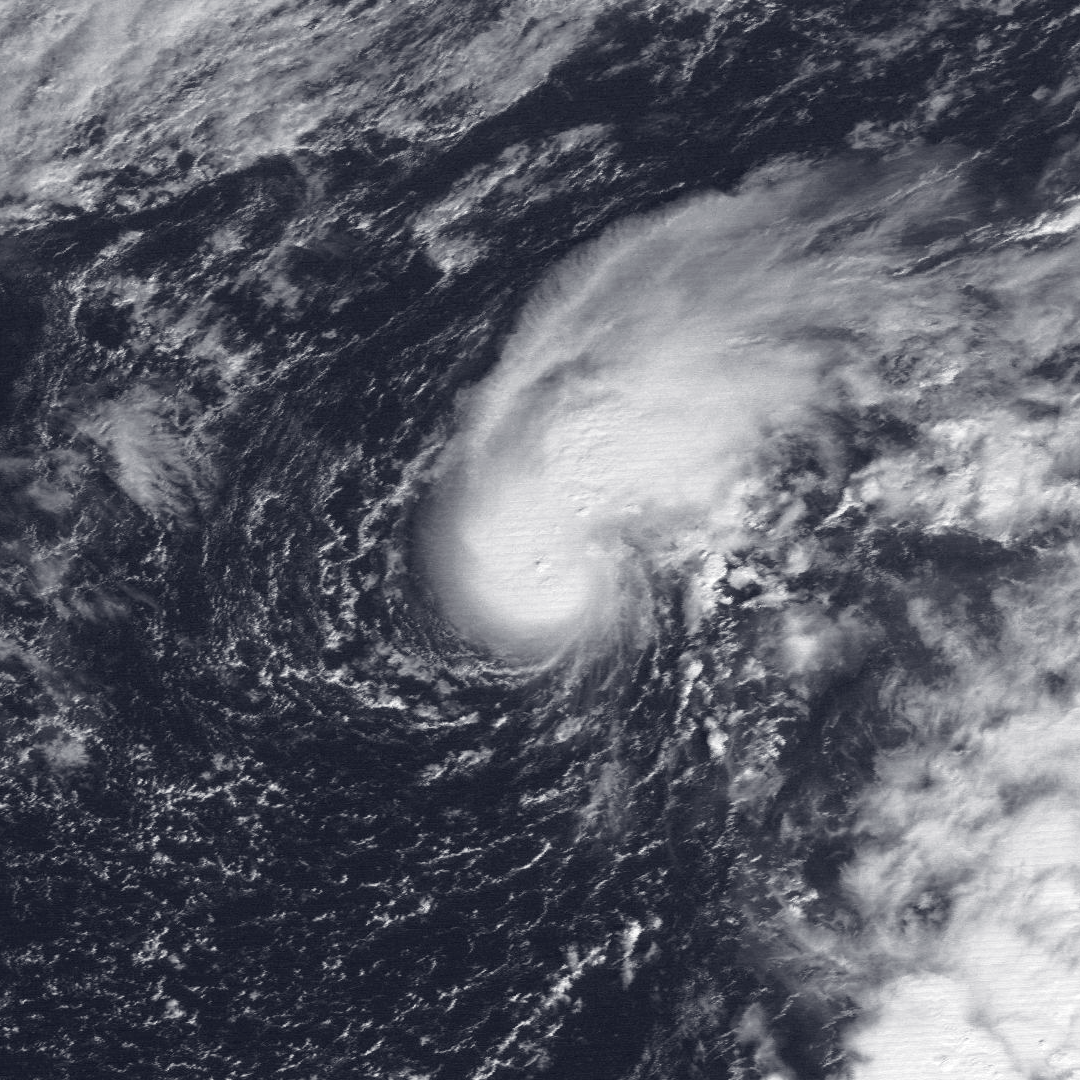
- Duration: October 29 – November 1
- Peak intensity: 50 mph (85 km/h) (1-min); 998 mbar (hPa)

On October 20, a mid-latitude low-pressure area was located well east of Atlantic Canada. The low moved southward for eight days. Convection increased around the center of circulation on October 29, as a result, a tropical depression formed approximately 1,045 mi (1,680 km) northeast of the Lesser Antilles at 12:00 UTC. Twelve hours later, the depression intensifed into Tropical Storm Jose. Moving generally northeastward, Jose peaked with maximum sustained winds of 50 mph (85 km/h) and a minimum barometric pressure of 998 mbar (29.5 inHg) on October 31. The storm then accelerated, reaching forward speeds up to 46 mph (74 km/h), and weakened and transitioned into a subtropical depression on November 1. Jose then passed just of Flores Island in the Azores and merged with a large area of cloudiness.

=== Hurricane Katrina ===
- Category 1 hurricane (SSHWS)
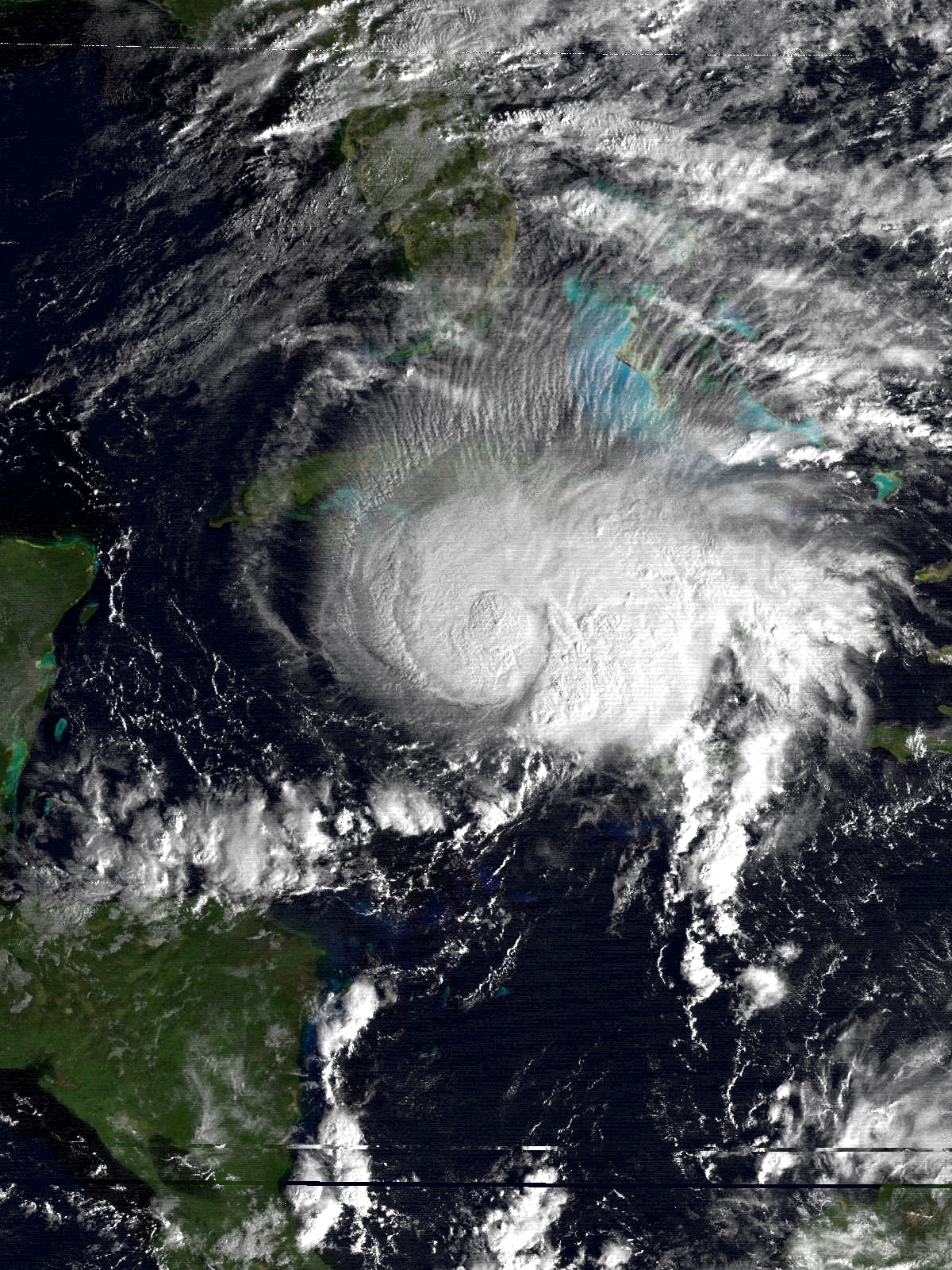
- Duration: November 3 – November 8
- Peak intensity: 85 mph (140 km/h) (1-min); 980 mbar (hPa)

A tropical depression formed on November 3 in the western Caribbean Sea about 150 mi (240 km) south of the Cayman Islands. The depression moved north, reaching tropical storm strength as it moved through the Cayman Islands. Katrina continued to strengthen, reaching hurricane strength and peaking with maximum sustained winds of 85 mph (140 km/h) and a minimum atmospheric pressure of 980 mbar (29 inHg) on November 5. On the following day, the storm struck Camagüey Province in Cuba and quickly weakened to a tropical storm. After emerging over water near Ragged Island in the Bahamas, the storm accelerated northeast through the island chain. Katrina's circulation fell apart, and the storm merged with a front on November 8 while centered about 350 mi (565 km) south of Bermuda.

The storm dropped heavy rainfall in the Cayman Islands and spawned a waterspout on Grand Cayman that resulted in minor damage. In Cuba, Katrina reportedly caused widespread flood damage, especially in Camagüey Province. A total of 4,641 homes were damaged to some degree, while 39 were demolished. Katrina also damagede approximately 80% of sugar cane crops. Two deaths also occurred in Cuba. Heavy precipitation in the Bahamas caused significant crop losses on Long Island.

=== Subtropical Storm Three ===
- Subtropical storm (SSHWS)
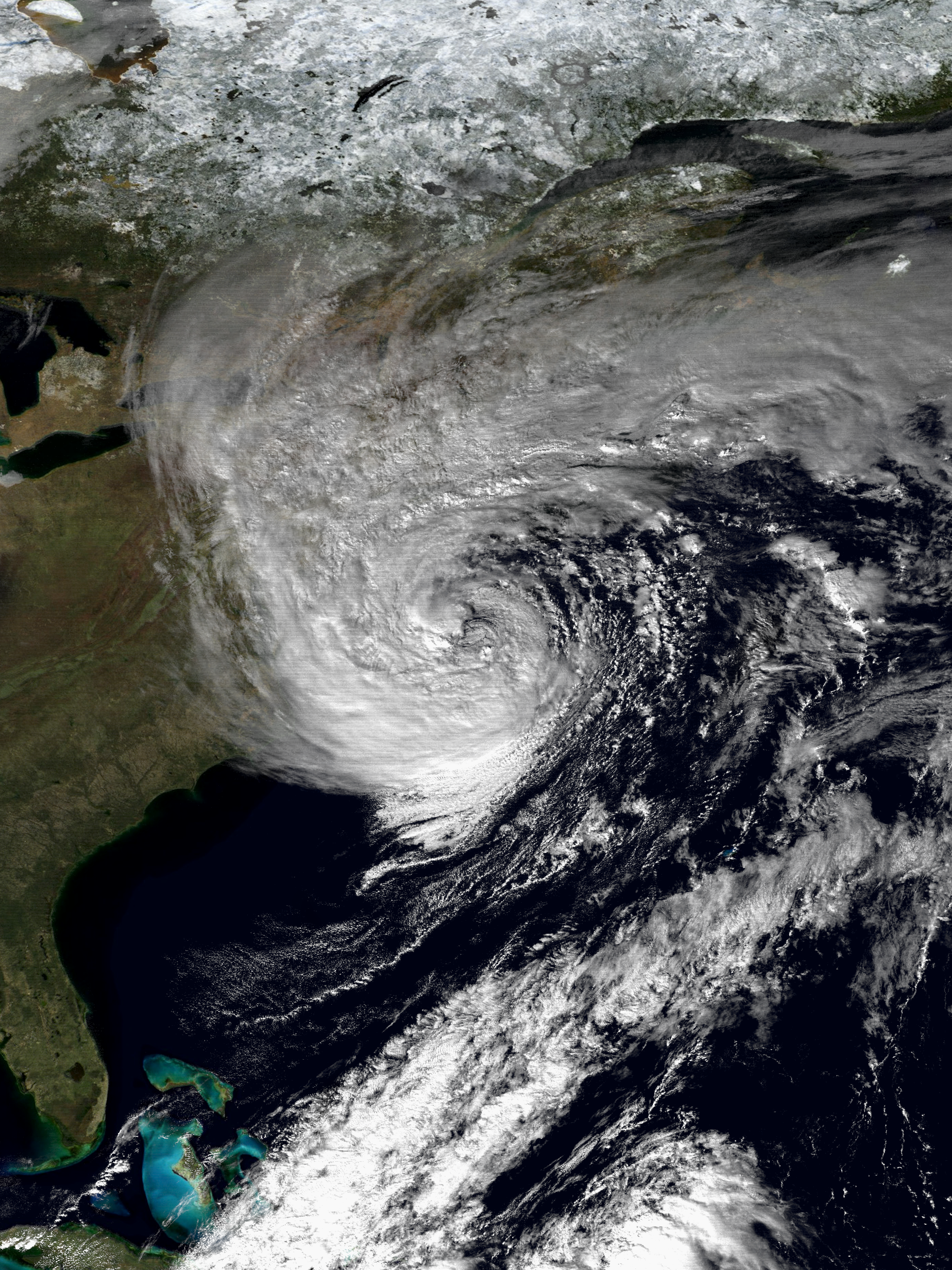
- Duration: November 12 – November 17
- Peak intensity: 70 mph (110 km/h) (1-min); 978 mbar (hPa)

A low-pressure area developed along a cold front over the warm waters of the Gulf Stream. At 12:00 UTC on November 12, the low organized into a subtropical storm while 400 mi (645 km) east of Jacksonville, Florida. After moving northeastward, it turned to the northwest, threatening the northeastern United States as an intensifying subtropical storm that was gradually developing tropical characteristics. A high pressure system turned it to the northeast, and after peaking with winds of 70 mph (110 km/h) and a minimum pressure of 978 mbar (28.9 inHg), the storm weakened and became extratropical near Nova Scotia on November 17.

Gale warnings were issued along the East Coast of the United States from Cape Hatteras, North Carolina, northward, and later in Nova Scotia. The storm produced significant beach erosion and coastal flooding. In North Carolina, abnormally high tides and coastal flooding damaged a motel in Topsail Beach and several homes throughout the state, with five swept away between Kitty Hawk and Nags Head. Some sections of Maryland beaches lost up to 8 ft (2.4 m) of sand, threatening coastal homes. In Delaware, South Bethany lost thousands of tons of sand, while waves swept away about half of the dune at the Indian River Inlet, the latter costing an estimated $95,000 to replace.

=== Other systems ===
Four additional tropical depressions formed during the season which were operationally thought to have not developed and thus went unnumbered. The first such system developed northeast of the Lesser Antilles on April 6. Moving slowly southwestward, the depression dissipated over the Anegada Passage about 24 hours later. A small craft advisory and special marine warning were issued by the National Weather Service office in San Juan, Puerto Rico. On April 19, another tropical depression formed over the southwestward Caribbean. The depression moved northeastward through the following day, before doubling-back to the southwest and dissipating by April 21. Another previously unnumbered tropical depression formed over the Bay of Campeche on June 17. It made landfall in Mexico south of Tampico before dissipating about two days later. A fourth unnumbered tropical depression developed near Andros on July 2. It made landfall in southeast Florida and later in South Carolina before dissipating on July 4. The depression dropped up 4 in (100 mm) of rainfall in Broward County, Florida, causing localized flooding. A waterspout-turned-tornado at Port Everglades overturned a shed and downed some power lines. Heavy precipitation also fell in South Carolina, especially in Clarendon and Sumter counties, inundating crops and flooding some cars, homes, a school, and stores in the Mayesville area.

A system operationally known as Tropical Depression Thirteen was tracked from September 23 to 24 east of the United States east coast, however it was later removed fom the Atlantic HURDAT database.

== Storm names ==
The following list of names was used for named storms that formed in the North Atlantic in 1981. Most names were used for the first time, except for Arlene, Cindy, and Irene, which had been previously used under the old naming convention. No names were retired following the season, thus the same list was used again for the 1987 season.

- Arlene
- Bret
- Cindy
- Dennis
- Emily
- Floyd
- Gert
- Harvey
- Irene
- Jose
- Katrina
- Lenny (unused)
- Maria (unused)
- Nate (unused)
- Ophelia (unused)
- Philippe (unused)
- Rita (unused)
- Stan (unused)
- Tammy (unused)
- Vince (unused)
- Wilma (unused)

== Season effects ==
This is a table of all of the storms that formed in the 1981 Atlantic hurricane season. It includes their name, duration, peak classification and intensities, areas affected, damage, and death totals. Deaths in parentheses are additional and indirect (an example of an indirect death would be a traffic accident), but were still related to that storm. Damage and deaths include totals while the storm was extratropical, a wave, or a low, and all of the damage figures are in 1981 USD.

Saffir–Simpson scale
TD	TS	C1	C2	C3	C4	C5

1981 North Atlantic tropical cyclone season statistics
Storm name	Dates active	Storm category at peak intensity	Max 1-min wind mph (km/h)	Min. press. (mbar)	Areas affected	Damage (US$)	Deaths	Ref(s).
Unnumbered	April 6 – April 7	Tropical depression	35 mph (56 km/h)	Unknown	None	None	None	
Unnumbered	April 19 – April 21	Tropical depression	30 mph (48 km/h)	Unknown	None	None	None	
Arlene	May 6 – May 9	Tropical storm	60 mph (97 km/h)	999 hPa (29.50 inHg)	Cuba, Bahamas	Minimal	None	
Two	June 3 – June 5	Tropical depression	35 mph (56 km/h)	1002 hPa (29.59 inHg)	Southern United States (Texas), Midwestern United States, Maryland	$4 million	3	
Unnumbered	June 17 – June 19	Tropical depression	35 mph (56 km/h)	Unknown	None	None	None	
Bret	June 29 – July 1	Tropical storm	70 mph (110 km/h)	996 hPa (29.41 inHg)	Old South (Virginia), Kentucky, Maryland, Pennsylvania, Midwestern United States	Minimal	1	
Unnumbered	July 2 – July 4	Tropical depression	35 mph (56 km/h)	Unknown	None	None	None	
Four	July 25 – July 26	Tropical depression	35 mph (56 km/h)	1008 hPa (29.77 inHg)	Mexico, Texas, Oklahoma, New Mexico, Arkansas, Louisiana	None	None	
Cindy	August 2 – August 5	Tropical storm	60 mph (97 km/h)	1002 hPa (29.59 inHg)	None	None	None	
Dennis	August 7 – August 21	Category 1 hurricane	80 mph (130 km/h)	995 hPa (29.38 inHg)	Lesser Antilles, Greater Antilles (Cuba), Southeastern United States (Florida and North Carolina)	$28.5 million	3	
Seven	August 17 – August 21	Tropical depression	35 mph (56 km/h)	1007 hPa (29.74 inHg)	None	None	None	
Eight	August 26 – August 29	Tropical depression	35 mph (56 km/h)	1004 hPa (29.65 inHg)	Mexico, South Central United States, Alabama, Tennessee	$56.2 million	5	
Emily	August 31 – September 11	Category 1 hurricane	90 mph (140 km/h)	966 hPa (28.53 inHg)	East Coast of the United States	None	None	
Floyd	September 3 – September 12	Category 3 hurricane	115 mph (185 km/h)	975 hPa (28.79 inHg)	Leeward Islands, Bermuda	None	None	
Gert	September 7 – September 15	Category 2 hurricane	105 mph (169 km/h)	988 hPa (29.18 inHg)	Leeward Islands, Puerto Rico, Bahamas, Bermuda	None	None	
Harvey	September 11 – September 19	Category 4 hurricane	130 mph (210 km/h)	946 hPa (27.94 inHg)	None	None	None	
Unnumbered	September 12 – September 12 14	Tropical depression	35 mph (56 km/h)	Unknown	Unknown	Unknown	Unknown	
Irene	September 21 – October 2	Category 3 hurricane	120 mph (190 km/h)	959 hPa (28.32 inHg)	None	None	None	
Fifteen	September 27 – October 4	Tropical depression	35 mph (56 km/h)	1010 hPa (29.83 inHg)	Leeward Islands	None	None	
Jose	October 29 – November 2	Tropical storm	50 mph (80 km/h)	998 hPa (29.47 inHg)	Azores	None	None	
Katrina	November 3 – November 7	Category 1 hurricane	85 mph (137 km/h)	980 hPa (28.94 inHg)	Cayman Islands, Jamaica, Cuba, Bahamas, Turks and Caicos Islands	Minimal	2	
Three	November 12 – November 17	Subtropical storm	70 mph (110 km/h)	978 hPa (28.88 inHg)	East Coast of the United States	None	None	
Season aggregates
22 cyclones	April 6 -November 17		135 mph (217 km/h)	946 hPa (27.9 inHg)		$88.7 million	14	

== See also ==
- 1981 Pacific hurricane season
- 1981 Pacific typhoon season
- 1981 North Indian Ocean cyclone season
- Australian cyclone seasons: 1980–81, 1981–82
- South Pacific cyclone seasons: 1980–81, 1981–82
- South-West Indian Ocean cyclone seasons: 1980–81, 1981–82
- South Atlantic tropical cyclone
- Mediterranean tropical-like cyclone
