= Hurricane Katrina (1981) =

Category 1 Atlantic hurricane in 1981

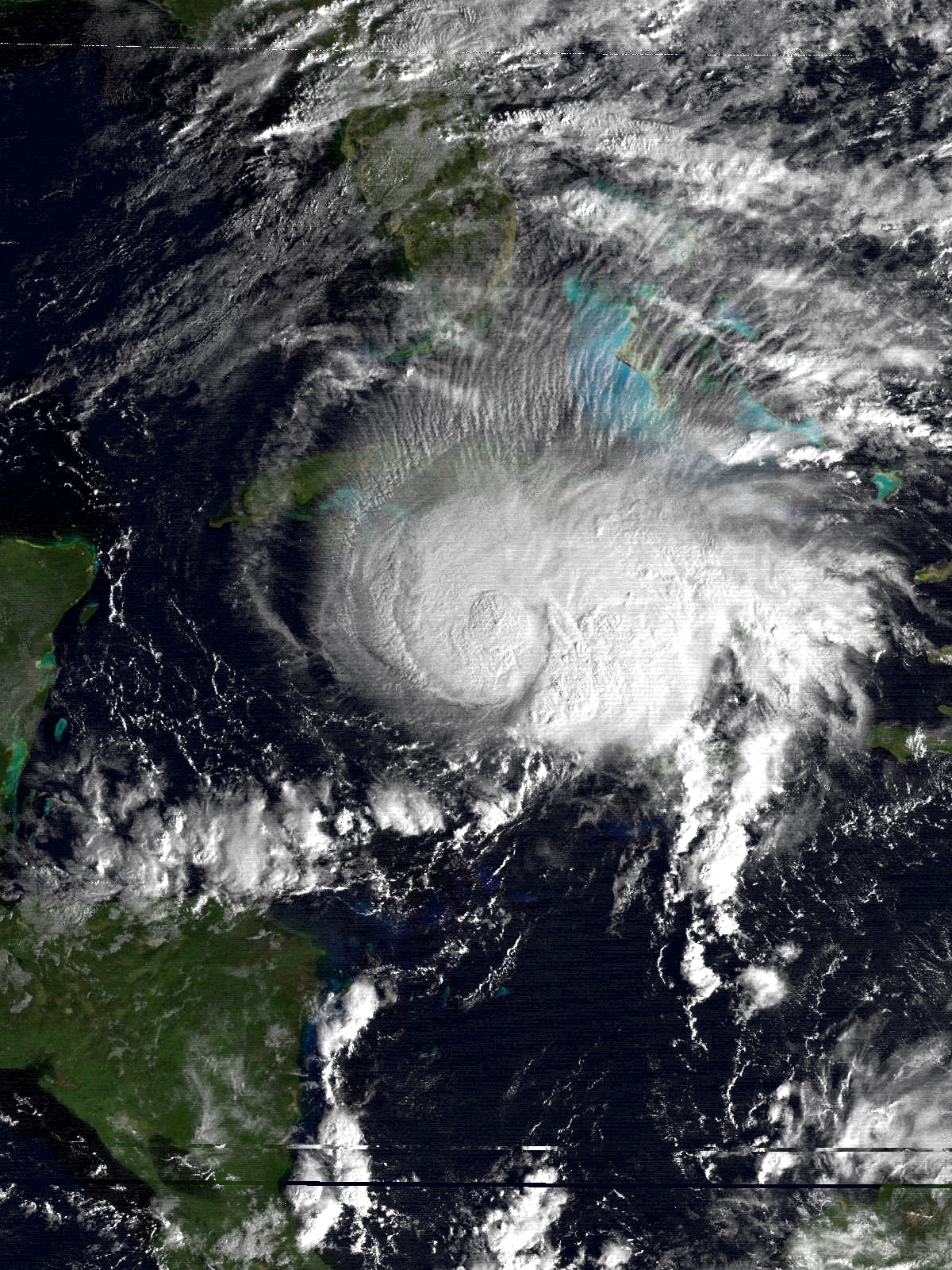
- Hurricane Katrina shortly after peak intensity near landfall in Cuba on November 5

Meteorological history
- Formed: November 3, 1981
- Dissipated: November 8, 1981

Category 1 hurricane
- 1-minute sustained (SSHWS/NWS)
- Highest winds: 85 mph (140 km/h)
- Lowest pressure: 980 mbar (hPa); 28.94 inHg

Overall effects
- Fatalities: 2 direct
- Damage: Minimal
- Areas affected: Cayman Islands, Jamaica, Cuba, The Bahamas, Turks and Caicos Islands
- IBTrACS
- Part of the 1981 Atlantic hurricane season

Hurricane Katrina was a late-forming tropical cyclone that impacted portions of the Greater Antilles and Bahamas in November 1981. The twenty-first tropical cyclone, eleventh named storm, and seventh hurricane of the 1981 Atlantic hurricane season, Katrina developed from an area of cloudiness in the western Caribbean Sea early on November 3. The initial tropical depression deepened slowly, and was upgraded to Tropical Storm Katrina on November 5. About six hours later, Katrina peaked with sustained winds of 85 mph (140 km/h). The storm made landfall along the south coast of Camagüey Province in Cuba early on November 6. Katrina quickly weakened to a tropical storm, before emerging into the Atlantic Ocean hours later. The system then accelerated northeastward and crossed the Bahamas late on November 6. Katrina dissipated late on November 7, shortly before merging with a frontal system.

On Grand Cayman, a waterspout ripped out a grape tree and slammed it into the Brac Reef Hotel's bar. Heavy rainfall was observed on Cuba, peaking at 15.74 inches (400 mm). As a result, Cuba experienced flash flooding in mountainous areas as Katrina moved across the country. In southern Camagüey Province, several bridges and railroads were reportedly washed out. Two sugar mills suffered damage. An estimated 4,641 homes suffered impact, 39 of which were destroyed. In addition, approximately 80% of sugar cane crops were damaged. Two people drowned in Cuba while attempting to cross a swollen river in Camagüey Province. The Bahamas received up to 14 in (360 mm) of rain, causing flood damage to watermelon, tomato and corn crops, particularly on Long Island.

== Meteorological history ==
Map plotting the storm's track and intensity, according to the Saffir–Simpson scale Map key Saffir–Simpson scale Tropical depression (≤38 mph, ≤62 km/h) Tropical storm (39–73 mph, 63–118 km/h) Category 1 (74–95 mph, 119–153 km/h) Category 2 (96–110 mph, 154–177 km/h) Category 3 (111–129 mph, 178–208 km/h) Category 4 (130–156 mph, 209–251 km/h) Category 5 (≥157 mph, ≥252 km/h) Unknown Storm type Tropical cyclone Subtropical cyclone Extratropical cyclone, remnant low, tropical disturbance, or monsoon depression

On November 1, an area of disturbed weather – a mass of cloudiness and thunderstorms – developed over the western Caribbean Sea. Subsequently, a low pressure area began to form. The system was designated a tropical depression early on November 3, while located about 150 miles (240 km) to the south of the Cayman Islands. Operationally, the National Hurricane Center began issuing advisories on the tropical depression at 2200 UTC on November 3. In the initial advisory, it was noted that the depression would slowly strengthen, but reach tropical storm status within 24 hours due to "strong" convection. The depression remained disorganized through early on November 4, with satellite imagery and weather stations in the Caribbean Sea region indicating no intensification. However, only a few hours later, the depression strengthened into Tropical Storm Katrina, while drifting northward.

Continuing to strengthen, Katrina slowly recurved north-northeastward and eventually to the northeast. The National Hurricane Center operationally classified Katrina as a tropical depression until 1600 UTC on November 4, after a reconnaissance aircraft flight reported tropical storm force winds. At 0600 UTC on November 5, the storm strengthened into a Category 1 hurricane on the Saffir–Simpson hurricane wind scale. Later that same day, Katrina attained its peak intensity after another reconnaissance aircraft flight reported a minimum barometric pressure of 980 mbar (29 inHg), and observed maximum sustained winds of about 85 mph (140 km/h) on the surface. However, Katrina weakened slightly while approaching Cuba. Early on November 6, the storm made landfall in Camagüey Province with winds of 75 mph (120 km/h). Shortly after moving inland, the system weakened to a tropical storm. A deepening trough offshore the East Coast of the United States caused Katrina to accelerate east-northeastward. By 1330 UTC on November 6, the storm emerged into the Atlantic Ocean. Katrina slowly weakened while crossing through the central Bahamas later that day. After a reconnaissance aircraft flight failed to locate a closed circulation, the system dissipated late on November 7, while located about 380 miles (610 km) south-southeast of Bermuda.

== Preparations and impact ==
Hurricane Katrina on November 6, 1981

In anticipation of Katrina, 150,000 people and 120,000 head of cattle in central Cuba were evacuated, according to a broadcast by Havana radio. As a result, Cuban Civil Defense officers issued a storm alert for five provinces. A hurricane watch was declared for the central and eastern Bahamas, leading to the evacuation of approximately 62,000 people. Along the southeast coast of Florida, small craft were advised to remain close to port.

Throughout the Cayman Islands, Katrina dropped up to 12 inches (300 mm) of precipitation. In Grand Cayman, a waterspout ripped out a grape tree and slammed it into the Brac Reef Hotel's Bar. The highest observed 24-hour precipitation total in Cuba was 13.03 inches (331 mm), while rainfall in the nation peaked at 15.74 inches (400 mm). As a result, Cuba experienced flash flooding in mountainous areas as Katrina moved across the country. In southern Camagüey Province, a number of bridges and railroads were washed out. Two sugar mills suffered damage. About 4,641 homes suffered impact, 39 of which were destroyed. In addition, an estimated 80% of sugar cane crops were damaged. Two people drowned in Cuba while attempting to cross a swollen river in Camagüey Province. The Bahamas received up to 14 in (360 mm) of rain. Heavy rains in the central islands caused flood damage to watermelon, tomato and corn crops on Long Island. Bad weather from Hurricane Katrina caused the cancellation of the 15th running of the Benson and Hedges Gold Cup Race.

== See also ==
- Other storms named Katrina
- North Atlantic tropical cyclone
