= Hurricane Dennis (1981) =

Category 1 Atlantic hurricane in 1981

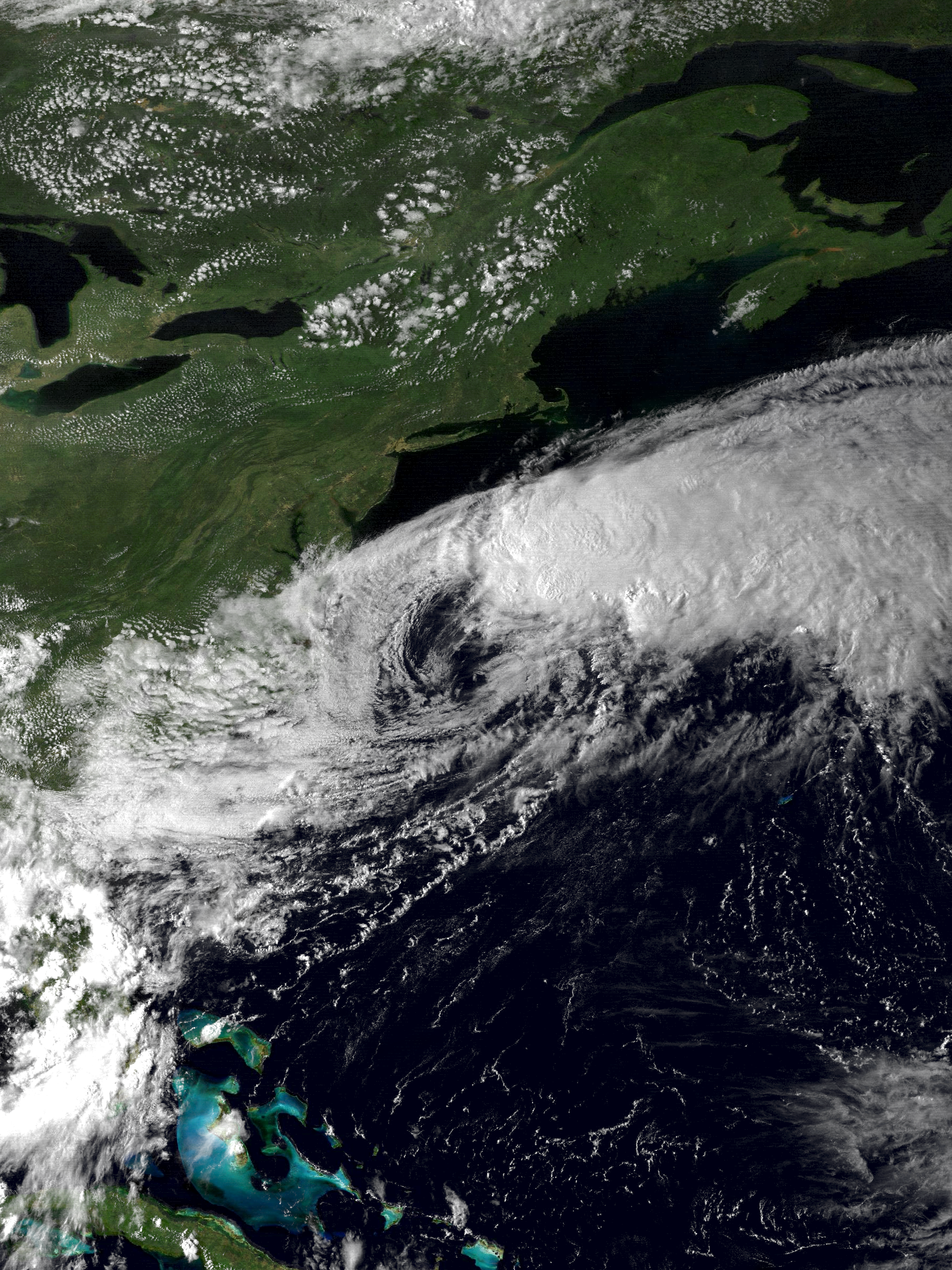
- Dennis near peak intensity off the coast of Maryland on August 20, 1981

Meteorological history
- Formed: August 7, 1981
- Extratropical: August 22, 1981
- Dissipated: August 26, 1981

Category 1 hurricane
- 1-minute sustained (SSHWS/NWS)
- Highest winds: 80 mph (130 km/h)
- Lowest pressure: 995 mbar (hPa); 29.38 inHg

Overall effects
- Fatalities: 3
- Damage: $28.5 million (1981 USD)
- Areas affected: Lesser Antilles, Greater Antilles, The Bahamas, Florida, Georgia, Carolinas, Virginia
- IBTrACS
- Part of the 1981 Atlantic hurricane season

Hurricane Dennis was a disorganized Category 1 hurricane that caused severe flooding in Miami-Dade County, Florida, as a tropical storm in August 1981. The tenth tropical cyclone and fourth named storm of the season, Dennis developed from a tropical wave well south of Cabo Verde on August 7. The depression intensified into a tropical storm early the next day. Dennis then encountered strong wind shear, causing the storm to weaken to a tropical depression on August 11. After crossing the Windward Islands on August 12, Dennis degenerated into a tropical wave several hours later over the Caribbean Sea. The wave became a tropical depression again late on August 15 while approaching Cuba. Dennis reintensified into a tropical storm before landfall in Matanzas Province. The cyclone emerged into the Straits of Florida on August 16, before striking the Florida Keys and then mainland Monroe County early the next day. It drifted across Florida, reaching the Atlantic near Cape Canaveral on August 19. Dennis continued to intensify and made landfall near Emerald Isle, North Carolina, but moved east-northeastward and soon tracked offshore. Late on August 20, Dennis deepened into a hurricane with winds of 80 mph (130 km/h), before weakening to a tropical storm over colder waters on August 21. Dennis became extratropical northeast of Bermuda early on August 22 and persisted until being absorbed by a frontal system on August 26.

In the Caribbean, Dennis dropped heavy rainfall on some islands, including Martinique, Saint Lucia, Virgin Islands, and the Greater Antilles. Flooding in Jamaica left at least 50 people homeless. In Florida, heavy rain fell in many areas to the east of the storm's path. Much of southeast Florida received at least 7 in (180 mm) of precipitation, while over 25.56 in (649 mm) of rain fell in Homestead. Nearly all of Miami-Dade County was flooded to the south of Kendall Drive. Many businesses and homes in cities such as Homestead and Florida City suffered water damage. However, the worst damage was incurred to crops, which experienced a loss of over $17.26 million (1981 USD). (Note: All damage figures are in 1981 USD, unless otherwise noted) One death and nearly $18.5 million in damage occurred in Florida. Further north, Dennis also caused flooding in the Carolinas, inundating many streets and causing crop damage in both states. A weather-related traffic accident in South Carolina resulted in two fatalities. Twenty families in Columbus County, North Carolina evacuated after the Waccamaw River overran its banks. Overall, Dennis caused three deaths and about $28.5 million in damage.

== Meteorological history ==
Map plotting the storm's track and intensity, according to the Saffir–Simpson scale Map key Saffir–Simpson scale Tropical depression (≤38 mph, ≤62 km/h) Tropical storm (39–73 mph, 63–118 km/h) Category 1 (74–95 mph, 119–153 km/h) Category 2 (96–110 mph, 154–177 km/h) Category 3 (111–129 mph, 178–208 km/h) Category 4 (130–156 mph, 209–251 km/h) Category 5 (≥157 mph, ≥252 km/h) Unknown Storm type Tropical cyclone Subtropical cyclone Extratropical cyclone, remnant low, tropical disturbance, or monsoon depression

Satellite imagery indicated that a well-organized tropical wave emerged into the Atlantic Ocean from the west coast of Africa on August 5. The wave headed westward and organized further, developing into a tropical depression at 06:00 UTC on August 7 while situated about 300 mi (480 km) south-southwest of the Cabo Verde Islands. Early on August 8, satellite imagery indicated that the depression intensified into Tropical Storm Dennis. The cyclone strengthened slightly further, reaching winds of 45 mph (75 km/h); wind shear prevented additional deepening and eventually caused Dennis to weaken to a tropical depression while approaching the Lesser Antilles on August 11 Early on August 12, the system crossed through the Windward Islands with a poorly defined circulation, making landfall in or passing close to Martinique. Dennis continued weakening after entering the Caribbean Sea, degenerating back into a tropical wave at 00:00 UTC on August 13 while located about 170 mi (270 km) south of Dominican Republic.

The remnant tropical wave gradually curved northwestward and brushed western Jamaica on August 14. As the wave approached the south coast of central Cuba, it rapidly re-organized into a tropical cyclone, becoming a tropical depression again at 18:00 UTC on August 15. Around 00:00 UTC the following day, the depression re-intensified into a tropical storm and made landfall in Cuba near Playa Girón in Matanzas Province. Dennis moved northward across the island and emerged into the Straits of Florida near Cárdenas shortly after 06:00 UTC. While crossing the Straits of Florida, deep convection associated with the cyclone attempted to become concentrated near the center and develop an eyewall. However, interaction with a trough prevented Dennis from intensifying despite passing over warm sea surface temperatures. The storm decelerated while approaching Florida due to weak steering currents.

Late on August 16, Dennis moved across the middle Florida Keys as a minimal tropical storm. Between 06:00 UTC and 12:00 UTC on August 17, Dennis made landfall in rural mainland Monroe County with winds of 40 mph (65 km/h). The cyclone moved slowly north-northeastward across Florida until emerging into the Atlantic just north of Cape Canaveral early on August 19. Dennis continued to deepen while moving offshore the Southeastern United States. The storm curved northeastward and made landfall near Emerald Isle, North Carolina, with winds of 65 mph (100 km/h). Dennis then accelerated east-northeastward and soon re-emerged into the Atlantic from Hatteras Island. Later on August 20, a reconnaissance aircraft flight observed sustained winds of 74 mph (119 km/h) and a barometric pressure of 995 mbar (29.4 inHg) – the lowest pressure associated with the storm. On this basis, Dennis was upgraded to a Category 1 hurricane on Saffir–Simpson scale at 18:00 UTC. The hurricane intensified slightly further, peaking with maximum sustained winds of 80 mph (130 km/h) around 00:00 UTC on August 21. However, Dennis soon entered a region of increasingly colder sea surface temperatures, weakening into a tropical storm about six hours later. The system also began losing tropical characteristics, transitioning into an extratropical cyclone about 425 mi (685 km) south of Sable Island at 00:00 UTC on August 22. After Dennis became extratropical, the ship Carista Express observed sustained winds of 69 mph (111 km/h). The remnants turned northward on August 24 and began weakening. By August 26, the extratropical storm was absorbed by a frontal system.

== Preparations and impact ==
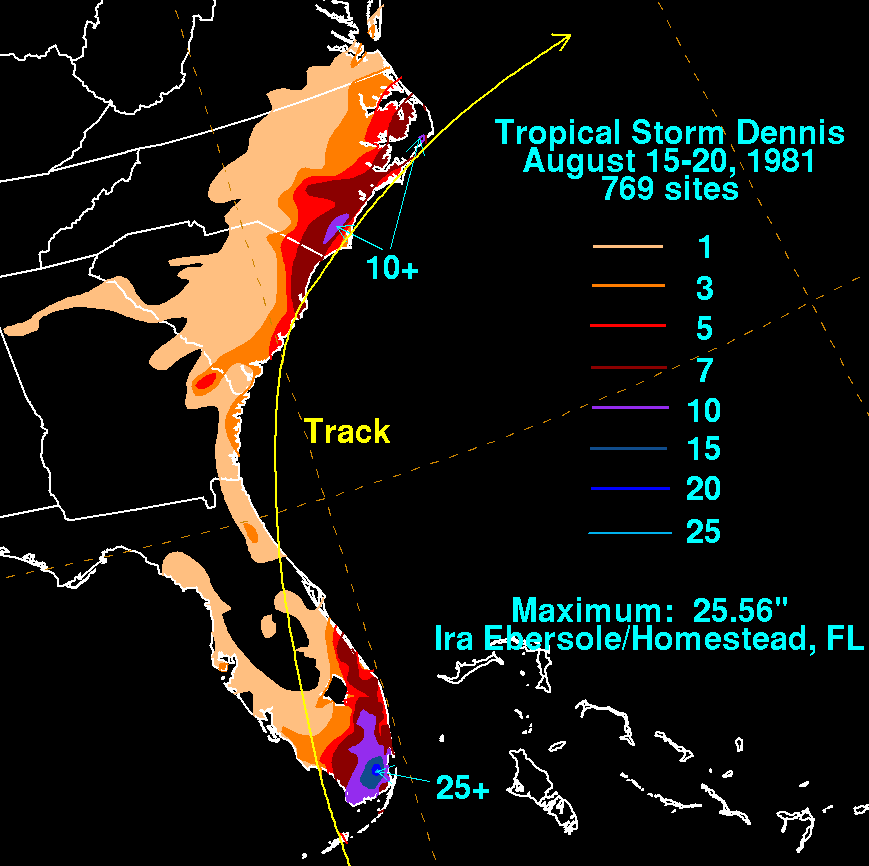
Total rainfall in the United States from Dennis

Dennis passed through the Caribbean Sea as a tropical depression and during its tropical wave stage, limiting impacts to heavy rainfall on Martinique, Saint Lucia, the Virgin Islands, Hispaniola, and the Greater Antilles. In Jamaica, portions of the island received about 7 in (180 mm) of precipitation. The resultant flooding forced the evacuation of dozens of residents and left at least 50 people homeless.

As Dennis approached the Florida Keys, several gale warnings were issued, with the first from Long Key to Dry Tortugas at 04:00 UTC on August 16. These gale warnings were posted progressively farther north along the East Coast of the United States, reaching as far north as Windmill Point in Virginia. Additionally, a hurricane watch was issued in South Florida from Fort Myers to Palm Beach, including the Florida Keys. Hundreds of people were evacuated from the campgrounds of Bahia Honda and John Pennekamp state parks. Shelters were also prepared to open in the Florida Keys if necessary. Typically, when a tropical cyclone approaches South Florida, the South Florida Water Management District drains Lake Okeechobee using the floodgates. However, due to a severe drought, water was instead directed into the lake from the connector canals. The storm resulted in a postponement of a second spraying to combat the spread of Mediterranean fruit flies in the Tampa Bay Area. About 40,000 tourists fled Myrtle Beach, South Carolina, including about 500 people from a campground, causing a loss of about $2 million to tourism. Some United States Military vessels were sent out to sea, while about 70 A-10 jets at the Myrtle Beach Air Force Base were flown to England Air Force Base near Alexandria, Louisiana.

Rainfall totals in South Florida were generally between 5 and 10 in (130 and 250 mm). However, little precipitation fell in Lake Okeechobee. Rainfall amounts in portions of southern Miami-Dade County ranged from 20 to 25 in (510 to 640 mm), with a peak total of 25.56 in (649 mm) in Homestead. An aerial survey of Miami-Dade County indicated that an approximately 100 sq mi (260 km^{2}) area from the eastern edge of the Everglades from just south of Miami to the southern tip of Florida was flooded with 6 to 24 in (150 to 610 mm) of water – described as a "solid sheet of water from Kendall Drive all the way south" – while Homestead and West Kendall were inundated with water about 5.5 ft (1.7 m) in depth. At a trailer park in Homestead, water approached the doors of the mobile homes. A number of other homes in Homestead and Florida City were flooded. Many businesses in downtown Homestead closed after water began entering the buildings, with some store owners placing sandbags in front of their business. Dozens of cars were abandoned as roads began to flood. News reports noted that homes resembled islands, while roads were reduced to "an impassable goo." Flooding at Homestead Air Force Base forced officials to evacuate 86 aircraft.

There were major losses to commercial and residential buildings due to roof failures caused by Dennis. Damage to private property was estimated at slightly more than $983,000. Heavier losses was sustained to the agriculture of Florida due to slow draining water in some areas. Fruit and vegetable crops suffered just over $17.26 million in damage. Tropical vegetables and avocados in particular experienced extensive losses. Damage to the former reached about $5.1 million, with production losses occurring to 4,500 acres (1,800 ha) of calabaza, cassava, eddoe, and sweet potatoes. Approximately 650 acres (260 ha) of avocado trees were destroyed, causing a loss of more than 100,000 boxes, with the fruit suffering over $3.5 million in damage. The standing water also caused health issues for local residents, including septic tanks contaminating water wells. The storm spawned two tornadoes, one on Plantation Key and the other in northern Miami-Dade County, though both resulted in only minor damage. Approximately 122,500 businesses and homes in Broward, Miami-Dade, and Palm Beach counties were left without electricity, while more than 8,000 people lost telephone service – mostly in southern Miami-Dade County. Restoration of telephone services took over a week, with the telephone company suffering about $500,000 in damage. One death occurred in the area after a man attempted to drive in high water, but his car swerved and crashed into a palm tree. Overall, Dennis left nearly $18.5 million in damage in Florida.

In response to the flooding, Governor of Florida Bob Graham signed an executive order authorizing 10 high-axle combat vehicles and 20 National Guardsmen to assist in the evacuation of residents south of Miami. At least 25 households were rescued, while dozens of other families left before becoming stranded, some of them by canoe. Three evacuation shelters were opened for those displaced from their homes. On September 24, over a month after Dennis dropped heavy rainfall in far southeastern Florida, Governor Graham issued a disaster declaration for a 7.5 sq mi (19 km^{2}) area just outside the eastern Everglades, where standing water remained.

The storm also brought heavy rainfall to states farther north, such as South Carolina and North Carolina, where similar, but less extensive losses to agriculture occurred. In the former, areas from north of Charleston to northeast Horry County observed 5 to 10 in (130 to 250 mm) of precipitation in a 24-hour period. The Waccamaw River reached its highest level since 1945. In downtown Charleston, several streets were flooded, forcing residents to park their cars on higher ground several blocks away. Two deaths occurred in North Charleston as a result of a traffic accident. Much of southeastern North Carolina observed at least 5 to 7 in (130 to 180 mm) of precipitation, with a peak of 10.65 in (271 mm) of rainfall to the north of Wilmington. Many creeks and streams in that portion of the state swelled significantly. At Pireway, an unincorporated community in Columbus County, about 20 families evacuated after the Waccamaw River exceed its banks. Flooding caused about $10 million in damage to crops in the county. Inundation by water caused several roads to close in New Hanover, Pamlico, and Pender counties. Along the coasts of North Carolina, Virginia, and Delaware, gusty winds and abnormally high tides left generally minor erosion and coastal flooding, though some homes were damaged at Willoughby Spit in Norfolk, Virginia. About 300 mi (480 km) to the northeast of Virginia Beach, Virginia, a husband and wife on a 34 ft (10 m) schooner became caught in 40 ft (12 m) waves, though they were both rescued by the Coast Guard.

== See also ==
- List of Florida hurricanes (1975-1999)
- Other storms of the same name
