= List of storms named Katrina =

The name Katrina has been used for seven tropical cyclones: three in the Atlantic Ocean, three in the East Pacific Ocean, and one in the South Pacific Ocean.

In the Atlantic:

- Hurricane Katrina (1981) – a Category 1 hurricane that affected the Greater Antilles and Lucayan Archipelago
- Tropical Storm Katrina (1999) – made landfall in Nicaragua and near the Belize–Mexico border
- Hurricane Katrina (2005) – a Category 5 hurricane that made landfall in Florida, Louisiana, and Mississippi, becoming the costliest tropical cyclone on record.

The name Katrina was retired after the 2005 season, being replaced with Katia.

In the East Pacific:

- Hurricane Katrina (1967) – a Category 1 hurricane that made landfall in Baja California at that intensity, sinking 60 ships
- Tropical Storm Katrina (1971) – made landfall in Sonora
- Hurricane Katrina (1975) – a Category 4 hurricane that brought major hurricane-force winds to Socorro Island

In the Australian region:

- Cyclone Katrina (1998) – a Category 4 severe tropical cyclone that affected the Solomon Islands, Vanuatu, and Australia

The name Katrina was retired after the 1997–98 season.

== See also ==
Storms with similar names

- Hurricane Catarina (2004) – The only known South Atlantic tropical cyclone to attain hurricane intensity.
- Cyclone Trina (2001) – A South Pacific tropical cyclone that caused the worst flooding in Mangaia, Cook Islands in nearly 50 years.
