= Tropical Depression Eight (1981) =

Atlantic tropical depression in 1981

- Tropical Depression Eight nearing Mexico and Texas on August 27

Meteorological history
- Formed: August 26, 1981
- Dissipated: August 29, 1981

Tropical depression
- 1-minute sustained (SSHWS/NWS)
- Highest winds: 35 mph (55 km/h)
- Lowest pressure: 1004 mbar (hPa); 29.65 inHg

Overall effects
- Fatalities: 5
- Damage: $56.2 million (1981 USD)
- Areas affected: Mexico, Southern United States
- IBTrACS
- Part of the 1981 Atlantic hurricane season

Tropical Depression Eight caused severe flooding in southeastern Texas in late August 1981. The twelfth tropical cyclone of the annual hurricane season, the depression developed from a tropical disturbance over the Bay of Campeche on August 26. Moving northwestward, the cyclone failed to intensify into a tropical storm before making landfall in the Mexican state of Tamaulipas to the north of Tampico on August 28, with winds of 35 mph (55 km/h). After moving inland, the depression curved north-northwestward before degenerating into a surface low pressure area near the Mexico–United States border on August 29. The remnants moved eastward across Texas and entered Louisiana before dissipating on September 1.

The system was a surface low upon reaching Texas. A large thunderstorm complex developed near its center on August 29 and resulted in heavy rainfall across southeastern Texas, with a peak total of 21 in (530 mm) in Pine Springs, with much of that falling in only about six hours. One of the hardest hit areas was Lavaca County. At least 15 streets in downtown Hallettsville were flooded, damaging hundreds of cars, 150 to 200 homes, 75 businesses, and a few local government buildings. Five people were killed by floodwaters in Shiner. Throughout Lavaca County, more than 286 homes were damaged or destroyed, 17 bridges and several roads were washed out, and hundreds of head of cattle were drowned. The depression spawned 14 tornadoes, one of which caused extensive damage in the area. Overall, the depression left five fatalities and more than $56.2 million (1981 USD) in damage. (Note: All damage figures are in 1981 USD, unless otherwise noted)

== Meteorological history ==
Map plotting the storm's track and intensity, according to the Saffir–Simpson scale Map key Saffir–Simpson scale Tropical depression (≤38 mph, ≤62 km/h) Tropical storm (39–73 mph, 63–118 km/h) Category 1 (74–95 mph, 119–153 km/h) Category 2 (96–110 mph, 154–177 km/h) Category 3 (111–129 mph, 178–208 km/h) Category 4 (130–156 mph, 209–251 km/h) Category 5 (≥157 mph, ≥252 km/h) Unknown Storm type Tropical cyclone Subtropical cyclone Extratropical cyclone, remnant low, tropical disturbance, or monsoon depression

In late August, a tropical disturbance, which was a portion of the same system that spawned Tropical Storm Irwin in the Pacific Ocean, reached the Bay of Campeche. At 18:00 UTC on August 26, the disturbance developed into a tropical depression about 140 mi (230 km) west of the Yucatán Peninsula. The cyclone moved northwestward and strengthened slightly to peak with maximum sustained winds of 35 mph (55 km/h) and a minimum barometric pressure of 1,004 mbar (29.6 inHg) at 12:00 UTC on August 27. The National Hurricane Center did not initiate advisories on Tropical Depression Eight until 22:00 UTC on August 28, after satellite imagery and reconnaissance aircraft confirmed that the system was a tropical depression. Shortly after 06:00 UTC on August 29, the depression made landfall in Tamaulipas about 45 mi (70 km) north of Tampico. About six hours later, the cyclone degenerated into a weak surface low pressure area just south of the Rio Grande. The low entered Texas on August 30 and moved northeastward and then east-northeastward due to an upper-level trough. While crossing the far eastern side of the state, the remnant low resumed its northeastward motion before entering Louisiana and dissipating on September 1.

== Preparations ==
In the Gulf of Mexico, non-essential workers at the oil rigs were evacuated, including about 40 employees of Shell Oil Company alone, as oil companies monitored the progress of the cyclone. As the depression approached landfall in Mexico, the National Hurricane Center warned about the possibility of flash flooding and tides ranging from 2 to 3 ft (0.61 to 0.91 m) above normal along the southern Texas coast, and advised small craft to remain in port. Several flood and flash flood warnings were issued throughout eastern Texas as the depression moved eastward and dropped heavy rainfall.

== Impact ==
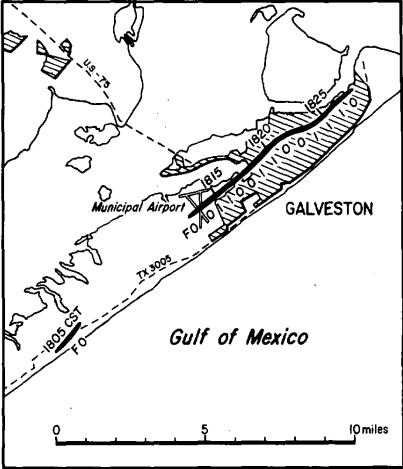
The path of the Galveston tornado

The depression spawned 14 tornadoes in Texas, most of which caused little to no damage. In Aransas Pass, a waterspout spawned over Redfish Bay moved ashore and destroyed a mobile home, deroofed a fishing lodge, and toppled electrical poles and power lines before lifting. In Live Oak County near Three Rivers, a tornado crossed a uranium mining business headquarters, extensively damaging a warehouse and an office. A few people received minor injuries. In a rural area of Bee County, a tornado demolished a mobile homes and a barn, unroofed another home, and downed several electrical poles. A tornado in Galveston shattered several windows, damaged some planes, and deroofed a few hangars at the Scholes International Airport, where the tornado produced a wind gust of 92 mph (148 km/h). The twister also severed a major power line; extensively damaged a fire station and a warehouse; and damaged or deroofed several homes and buildings, including at the Strand Historic District. Before lifting, the tornado tossed several 18-wheel trucks and damaged a pier at the Port of Galveston after a 450 ft (140 m) freighter broke loose.

After entering Texas, a large thunderstorm complex developed near the center of the system on August 29. As a result, heavy rainfall fell in a roughly 50 by 200 mi (80 by 322 km) area between Seguin and Houston. In Fayette County, 21 in (530 mm) of precipitation was recorded – the highest rainfall total from the depression – much of it falling in only about six hours. At LaGrange, "a sudden flood wave" caused the Colorado River to rise 5.5 ft (1.7 m) above flood stage. Some homes in the town received water damage after a creek overflowed. In Flatonia, residents evacuated as waters began rising. Eventually, the town became isolated after creeks swelled, while around a dozen homes were flooded. Interstate 10 was inundated in the town. Throughout the county, six bridges were washed away and several others were damaged. Several hundred heads of livestock drowned. Preliminary estimates place at damage toll in Fayette County at $2.7 million, with $1.5 million for property and $1.2 million incurred to agriculture.

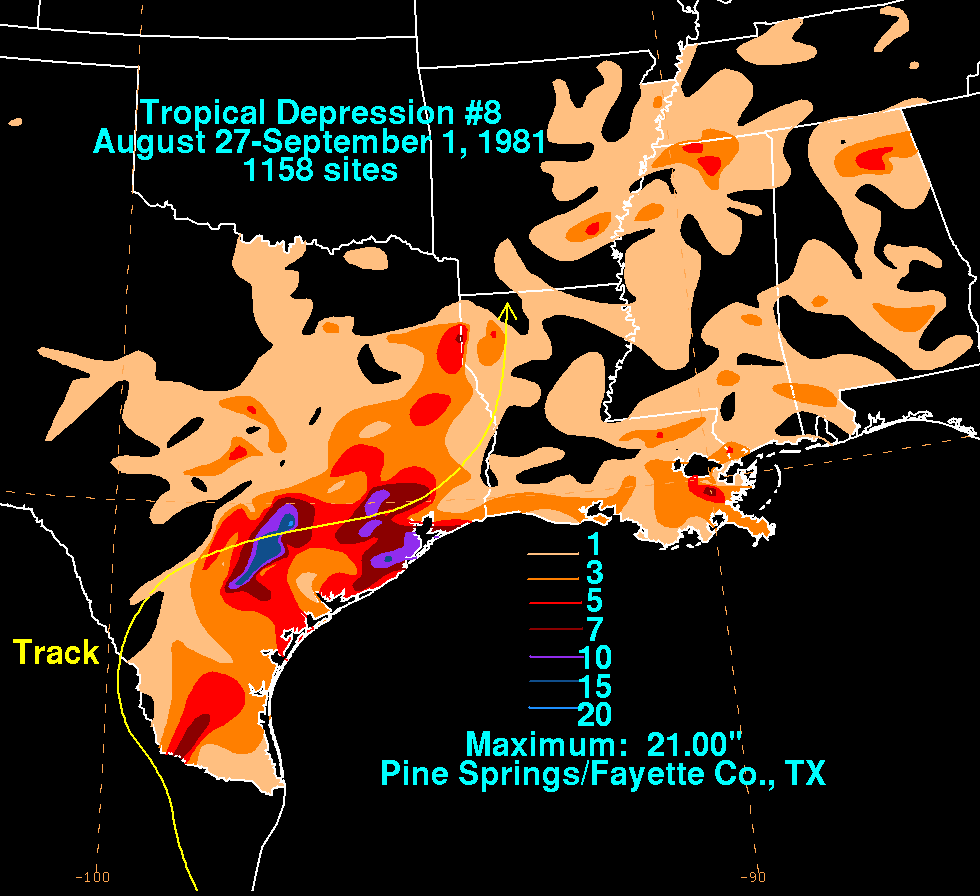
Rainfall totals in the United States

In Starr County, 4.7 in (120 mm) of precipitation fell in only about 90 minutes. Several low-lying streets were inundated by water, damaging dozens of vehicles. Some residents evacuated as water began entering homes. Rainfall in Brooks County peaked at 7.67 in (195 mm) in Falfurrias. The lowest-lying portions of the town were flooded after the Cibolo Creek swelled its bank, with water entering homes and businesses. Crops such as melons and vegetables were damaged. Between 4 and 6.5 in (100 and 170 mm) of precipitation fell overnight in Goliad County on August 30, flooding some farmlands after small creeks overflowed. In Karnes County, 16.29 in (414 mm) of rain fell at a weather station located 2 mi (3.2 km) south of Karnes City. Flooding in the town was mainly confined to damaged cars and roads as the community was situated at a higher elevation than surrounding areas. Kenedy suffered extensive damage after water surged down the Escondido Creek, causing approximately 300 people to evacuate. About 70 homes, 12 mobile homes, and a number of businesses and cars were damaged. In the rural areas of the county, at least 200 heads of cattle were killed. Damage reached approximately $5 million. In Bastrop and Caldwell counties, a number of farms in rural areas were flooded after several creeks and streams overflowed.

The community of Hochheim in DeWitt County observed around 17.5 in (440 mm) of precipitation over the course of one day, though much of it fell in four to six hours. Three people from injured near Hochheim after their car was swept off the road. The lower Guadalupe River crested at 42.3 ft (12.9 m) at Cuero, its second largest height on record. A number of residents evacuated from the city as the river began to rise. Flooding there damaged 40 homes and 4 businesses. Near Thomaston, a 72-year-old man was swept away by flood waters, but he survived and was found after four days. More than 2,000 head of cattle drowned, while crops such as hay and pecans experienced extensive losses. Damage in the county reached $2.4 million, including $1.4 million to property and $1.2 million to agriculture. In Gonzales County, the town of Cheapside observed 18 in (460 mm) of rain in a 24-hour period. All creeks exceeded their banks and the Guadalupe and San Marcos rivers rose sharply; the former crested at a near-record height. Close to 200 people were rescued from their homes, vehicles, or isolated high spot. In the city of Gonzales, water from the rapidly swelling Tinsley Creek damaged approximately 30 homes and mobile homes and washed away dozens of cars. About 50 homes and mobile homes in Waelder were flooded after multiple branches the Baldrige Creek overflowed their banks. Several other dwellings in and around Leesville suffered water damage after the O'Neil Creek reached its highest level since at least 1936. Portions of several highways in the county were inundated, including U.S. routes 90 and 90A; Texas Highway 97; and Interstate 10 near Waelder. Agriculture also suffered severely, with hundreds of cattle lost. Damage in the county was estimated at over $5 million.

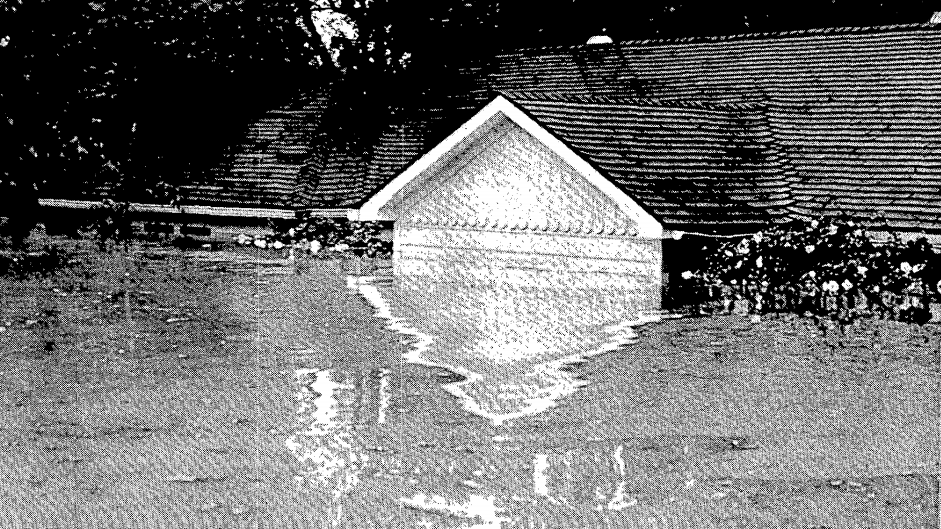
Floodwaters reaching a rooftop in Hallettsville

In Lavaca County, unofficial reports indicate that 19.96 in (507 mm) of precipitation fell at Dreyer in a 24-hour period. Severe flash flooding was experienced along many creeks in the northwestern side of the county. A flood wave moving down the Rock Creek caused severe damage to homes in Shiner. Three teenage boys drowned after a home was washed away and demolished. Two other deaths occurred in the city as a few cars attempted to cross the flooded U.S. Route 77A bridge. The Boggy Creek exceeded its banks, severing water and gas lines and washing away the Spoetzl Brewery bridge and nearby homes. Throughout Shiner, many cars and 118 homes were damaged, with several swept away. In Hallettsville, the Lavaca River crested at a record height of 41.2 ft (12.6 m). Fifteen streets were particularly hard hit, with much of downtown being inundated by about 5 ft (1.5 m) of water. A total of 150 to 200 dwellings and 75 businesses were damaged, as were some local government buildings. The basement of the county courthouse was inundated with 8 ft (2.4 m) of water, damaging equipment and furniture, while the jail was flooded up to the second floor, forcing the evacuation of prisoners. City Hall also received water damage. Hundreds of cars were severely damaged or completely ruined. A total of 18 homes in Moulton were damaged. Numerous roads were inundated and 17 bridges were washed away, including a bridge that was over 100 years old. Lavaca County suffered the worst impact from the storm, with damage reaching approximately $35 million.

Portions of Fort Bend County received over 10 in (250 mm) of rain, particularly in Richmond, Rosenberg, and Sugar Land. Some homes in low-lying areas south of Katy were flooded. A number of motorists drove into deep ditches after the edge of the roads were obscured by water. More than 1,000 acres (400 ha) of fields of harvestable cotton were inundated. In Brazoria County, the city of West Columbia observed at least 10.5 in (270 mm) of precipitation. Bayous and creeks rose throughout the county, especially in rural areas. In Alvin, streets and low-lying areas were flooded, while several businesses and homes in Angleton received water damage. Rainfall totals of 6 to 11 in (150 to 280 mm) in much of Harris County elevated a number of bayos and creeks, some of which exceeded their banks and forced the evacuation of hundreds of people. The Metropolitan Transit Authority of Harris County suspended bus service for several hours, stranding approximately 80,000 commuters. In Aldine, over 100 students were required to stay at school until water on the streets could recede, while street flooding in Houston resulted in the cancellation of classes at University of Houston and Texas Southern University. Across the county, several dozen businesses, 1,250 homes, and 1,000 vehicles were damaged. Three injuries occurred after a woman and her two children were submerged by water while in a pickup truck. In Galveston County, several major streets in Galveston, Hitchcock, La Marque, and Texas City were flooded. Dozens of dwellings in low-lying areas of La Marque and Texas City received extensive water damage, including 100 in the latter. The La Marque City Hall was also damaged. In Galveston, flooding primarily affected the first floor of buildings damaged by the tornado. State Highway 6, a major route to the city, was inundated at Interstate 45. Throughout Texas, damage exceeded $56.2 million.

Rainfall from the remnants of the depression spread into states farther east, including Alabama, Arkansas, Louisiana, Mississippi, and Tennessee.

== Aftermath ==
After the storm Bill Clements, the Governor of Texas, dispatched 20 National Guard personnel to Hallettsville on September 1 to prevent looting. The governor also requested a disaster declaration for Lavaca County, which was approved by American President Ronald Reagan on September 22. The declaration provided for 75% of the costs for assistance for individuals, families, and the public – including housing assistance for those eligible – with the remainder to be paid for by local and state governments. Monetary aid also became available for the repair and restoration of public buildings damaged or demolished by the flood. The Federal Emergency Management Agency ultimately paid out nearly $21 million for aid, with applicants receiving an average of just over $7,600. In the months following the disaster, local, state, and federal officials discussed mitigation efforts and recommendations for Lavaca County.

== See also ==
- List of Texas hurricanes (1980–present)
- Tropical Storm Amelia (1978)
- Tropical Storm Charley (1998)
