= Tropical Storm Bret (1981) =

Atlantic tropical storm in 1981

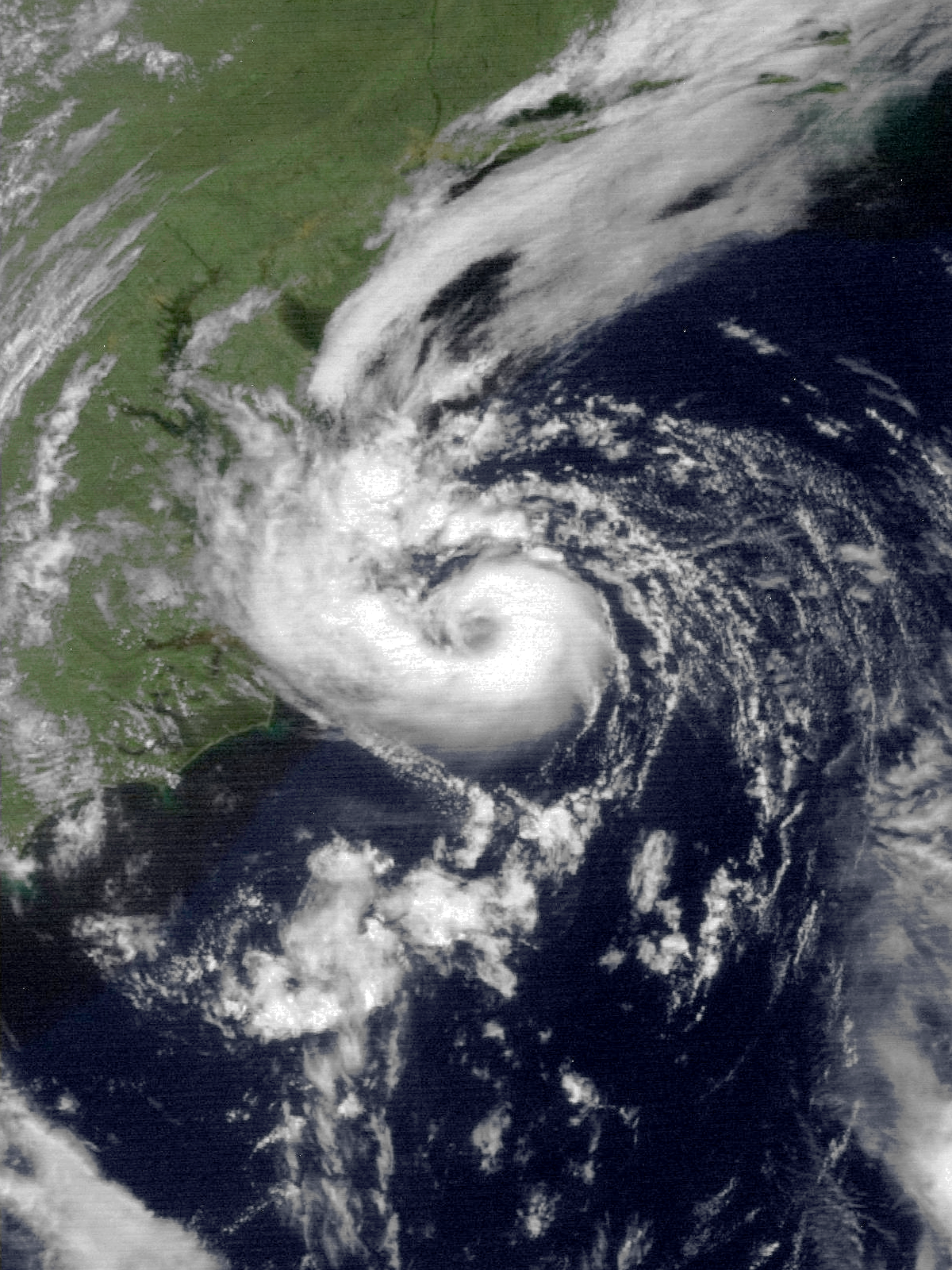
- Tropical Storm Bret on June 30

Meteorological history
- Formed: June 29, 1981
- Dissipated: July 1, 1981

Tropical storm
- 1-minute sustained (SSHWS/NWS)
- Highest winds: 70 mph (110 km/h)
- Lowest pressure: 996 mbar (hPa); 29.41 inHg

Overall effects
- Fatalities: 1 direct
- Areas affected: Mid-Atlantic, Ohio River Valley
- IBTrACS
- Part of the 1981 Atlantic hurricane season

Tropical Storm Bret was a strong tropical storm that made a rare landfall on the Delmarva Peninsula in June 1981. The sixth tropical cyclone, third designated tropical depression, and second named storm of the season, Bret developed as a subtropical storm from a large area of frontal clouds near Bermuda on June 29. Moving westward, the subtropical storm intensified while producing deep convection, and was consequently reclassified as a tropical storm early on June 30. Around that time, Bret peaked with sustained winds of 70 mph (110 km/h). The storm then began weakening and struck near Oyster, Virginia as a minimal tropical storm early on July 1. Upon moving inland, Bret weakened to a tropical depression and subsequently accelerated prior to dissipating over northern Virginia that same day.

In its early stages, Bret dropped light rainfall on Bermuda, peaking at 3.34 inches (85 mm). Impact in the United States was generally minor. In Virginia, the storm produced up to 4.48 inches (114 mm) of rain in Big Meadows section of Shenandoah National Park. Along the coast, minor beach erosion occurred due to tides up to 0.9 feet (0.27 m) above normal. In western Pennsylvania, locally heavy rainfall flooded some streets and basements. Elsewhere, Bret dropped 1 to 3 inches (25 to 76 mm) of precipitation to several states. One fatality was confirmed after a woman was killed by rip currents at Nags Head, North Carolina.

== Meteorological history ==
Map plotting the storm's track and intensity, according to the Saffir–Simpson scale Map key Saffir–Simpson scale Tropical depression (≤38 mph, ≤62 km/h) Tropical storm (39–73 mph, 63–118 km/h) Category 1 (74–95 mph, 119–153 km/h) Category 2 (96–110 mph, 154–177 km/h) Category 3 (111–129 mph, 178–208 km/h) Category 4 (130–156 mph, 209–251 km/h) Category 5 (≥157 mph, ≥252 km/h) Unknown Storm type Tropical cyclone Subtropical cyclone Extratropical cyclone, remnant low, tropical disturbance, or monsoon depression

A large band of frontal clouds became situated over the northwestern Atlantic Ocean on June 27. By the following day, satellite imagery indicated that a low-pressure area began developing northwest of Bermuda, along the northwest periphery of the frontal cloud band. Substantial amounts of deep convection eventually formed north and west of the low center. Thus, the system was designated as a subtropical storm at 1200 UTC on June 29, while centered approximately 575 miles (925 km) east of Cape Hatteras, North Carolina. The system continued to gain convection and intensify while tracking westward toward the Mid-Atlantic states at a forward speed of 20 mph (32 km/h). Early on June 30, a well-defined atmospheric circulation became apparent on infrared satellite imagery. As a result, subtropical storm transitioned into Tropical Storm Bret later that day at 0600 UTC.

Upon becoming a tropical cyclone early on June 30, Bret attained maximum sustained winds of 70 mph (110 km/h). About six hours later, at 1200 UTC, the storm also attained its minimum barometric pressure of 996 mbar (29.4 inHg). Around 2200 UTC on June 30, a reconnaissance aircraft flight observed hurricane-force winds, though Bret was not upgraded to a hurricane because the minimum barometric pressure was considered too high. About an hour later, the National Hurricane Center noted that Bret was moving westward toward Virginia at 20 mph (25 km/h) and entering a region of colder sea surface temperatures, causing further intensification to become unlikely. Subsequently, the storm curved west-northwestward and rapidly weakened. At 0500 UTC on July 1, Bret made landfall near Oyster, Virginia on the Delmarva Peninsula as a minimal tropical storm. About an hour later, the storm emerged into the Chesapeake Bay and weakened to a tropical depression. Later on July 1, Bret moved inland over mainland Virginia and continued to weaken, until dissipating over the northern portion of the state.

== Preparations and impact ==
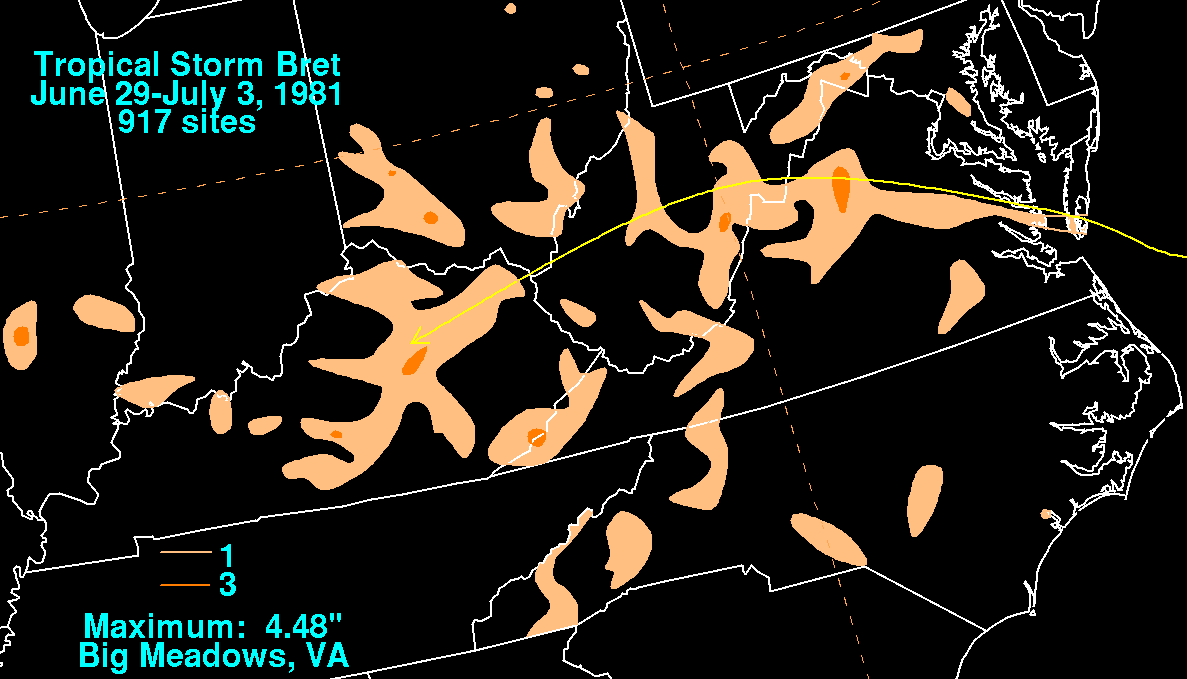
Rainfall totals from Bret

In its early stages, the subtropical precursor of Bret tracked north of Bermuda and dropped light rainfall on the island, peaking at 3.34 inches (85 mm).

While Bret was approaching the East Coast of the United States, various National Weather Service offices issued gale warnings. At 2000 UTC on June 30, a gale-force warning was issued for a portion of the North Carolina coastline extending from Cape Hatteras northward, including Albemarle and Pamlico sounds. Simultaneously, another gale warning was issued for areas along the Chesapeake Bay south of the Patuxent River in Maryland and on the east coast from Ocean City, Maryland to Virginia Beach, Virginia. Around 0300 UTC on July 1, all gale warnings were discontinued in North Carolina, while the remaining warnings in Maryland and Virginia were canceled about five hours later. Additionally, a small craft advisory was also posted for the North Carolina and Virginia coastlines. Officials in North Carolina closed off beaches at Nags Head, Kitty Hawk, and Kill Devil Hills from swimmers due to rip currents and tides. After Bret dissipated, the small craft warning remained in effect and mariners were told to remain in port until the weather calmed.

In Virginia, Bret produced relatively light rainfall, peaking at 4.48 inches (114 mm) in Big Meadows, a section of Shenandoah National Park. At the time of Bret's landfall, portions of the Mid-Atlantic states were experiencing a strong drought, though the amounts of precipitation were not enough for farmers in Virginia to save their crops. In Virginia Beach, local street flooding and a brief tornado were reported. Minor beach erosion occurred in the area due to tides reaching about 0.9 feet (0.27 m) above normal. One fatality was confirmed in North Carolina when a woman was killed after getting stuck in rip currents at Nags Head. Offshore, two boats lost contact with the Coast Guard during the approach to land, one of which washed up at Cape May, New Jersey and the other on the Virginia coast. The Coast Guard began cleanup of an oil spill at Nags Head caused by Bret off the coast. About 8 miles (13 km) of the shoreline was filled with oil, little of which polluted the water. Most of the oil was thin and easily cleanup private contractor. Locally heavy rainfall in western Pennsylvania flooded streets and basements in some areas, with up to 4 inches (100 mm) of precipitation in Brookville. Elsewhere, Bret dropped 1 to 3 inches (25 to 76 mm) of precipitation in several states. Overall, no considerable damage was reported.

== See also ==
- Tropical Storm Dean (1983) and Tropical Storm Danielle (1992) – made similarly rare landfalls on the Delmarva Peninsula
- Other storms of the same name
- List of North Carolina hurricanes (1980–1999)
