= Aquaculture in Tonga =

Aquaculture in Tonga has been the responsibility of the Ministry of Fisheries since the early 1970s. The main centre for this is the Sopu Mariculture Centre on the main island of Tongatapu, which is operated by the Ministry of Fisheries and was established with the assistance of the Government of Japan. A serious setback was experienced in 1982 as a result of damage caused by Cyclone Isaac.

The Tonga government provides for the development and management of aquaculture in the country through the Aquaculture Management Act 2003, also known as the Aquaculture Act. Some progress has been made with developing aquaculture but this has tended to be on a small-scale and there have been no substantial commercial developments. There is ongoing investment in aquaculture for species showing the potential to develop into small industries and the Mariculture Centre at the Ministry of Fisheries breeds giant clams, bêche-de-mer and other species, including seaweed. It has also been importing milkfish from Kiribati and Fiji, initially to restock a lagoon on the island of Nomuka, in the south of the Ha’apai Group. There is considerable interest in further promotion of aquaculture to increase the availability of affordable fish-based protein in domestic markets.
