= 1981–82 Australian region cyclone season =

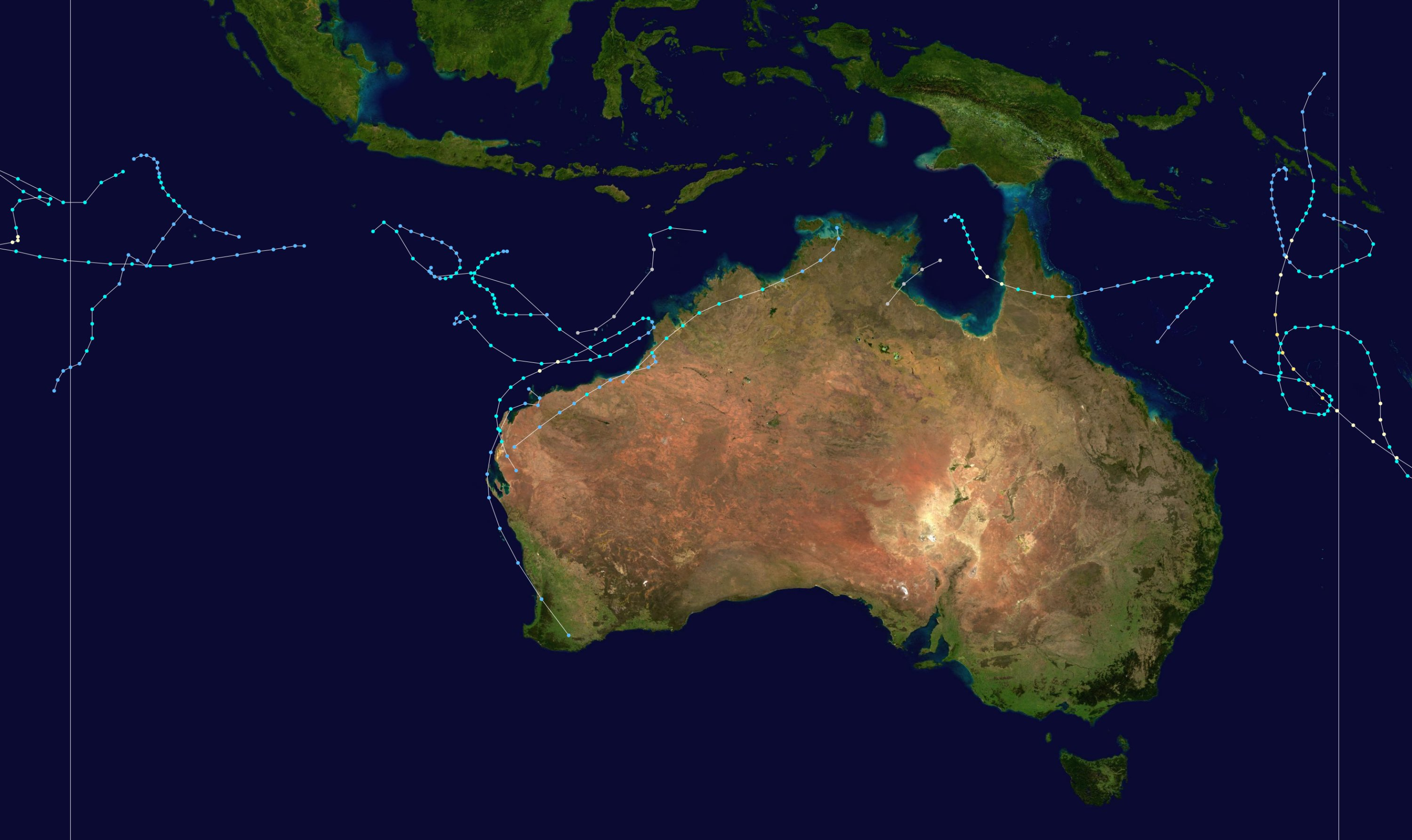
- Season summary map

Seasonal boundaries
- First system formed: 30 November 1981
- Last system dissipated: 16 May 1982

Strongest storm
- By maximum sustained winds: Dominic
  - Maximum winds: 215 km/h (130 mph) (10-minute sustained)
  - Lowest pressure: 950 hPa (mbar)
- By central pressure: Bernie
  - Maximum winds: 185 km/h (115 mph) (10-minute sustained)
  - Lowest pressure: 945 hPa (mbar)

Seasonal statistics
- Tropical lows: 14, 1 unofficial
- Tropical cyclones: 14, 1 unofficial
- Severe tropical cyclones: 4
- Total fatalities: Unknown
- Total damage: $14.5 million (1982 USD)

Related articles
- 1981–82 South-West Indian Ocean cyclone season; 1981–82 South Pacific cyclone season

The 1981–82 Australian region cyclone season was an average season. It officially started on 1 November 1981, and officially ended on 30 April 1982.

== Systems ==
=== Tropical Cyclone Amelia ===
- Category 1 tropical cyclone (Australian scale)
- Tropical storm (SSHWS)
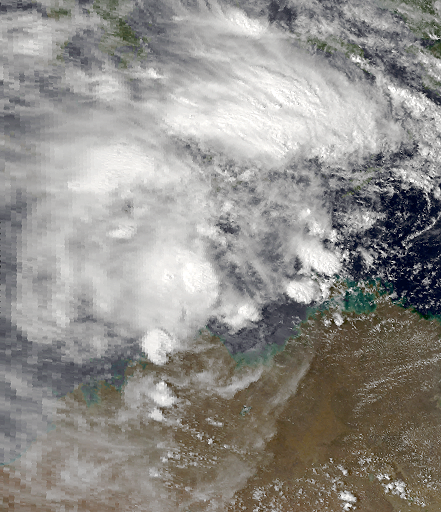
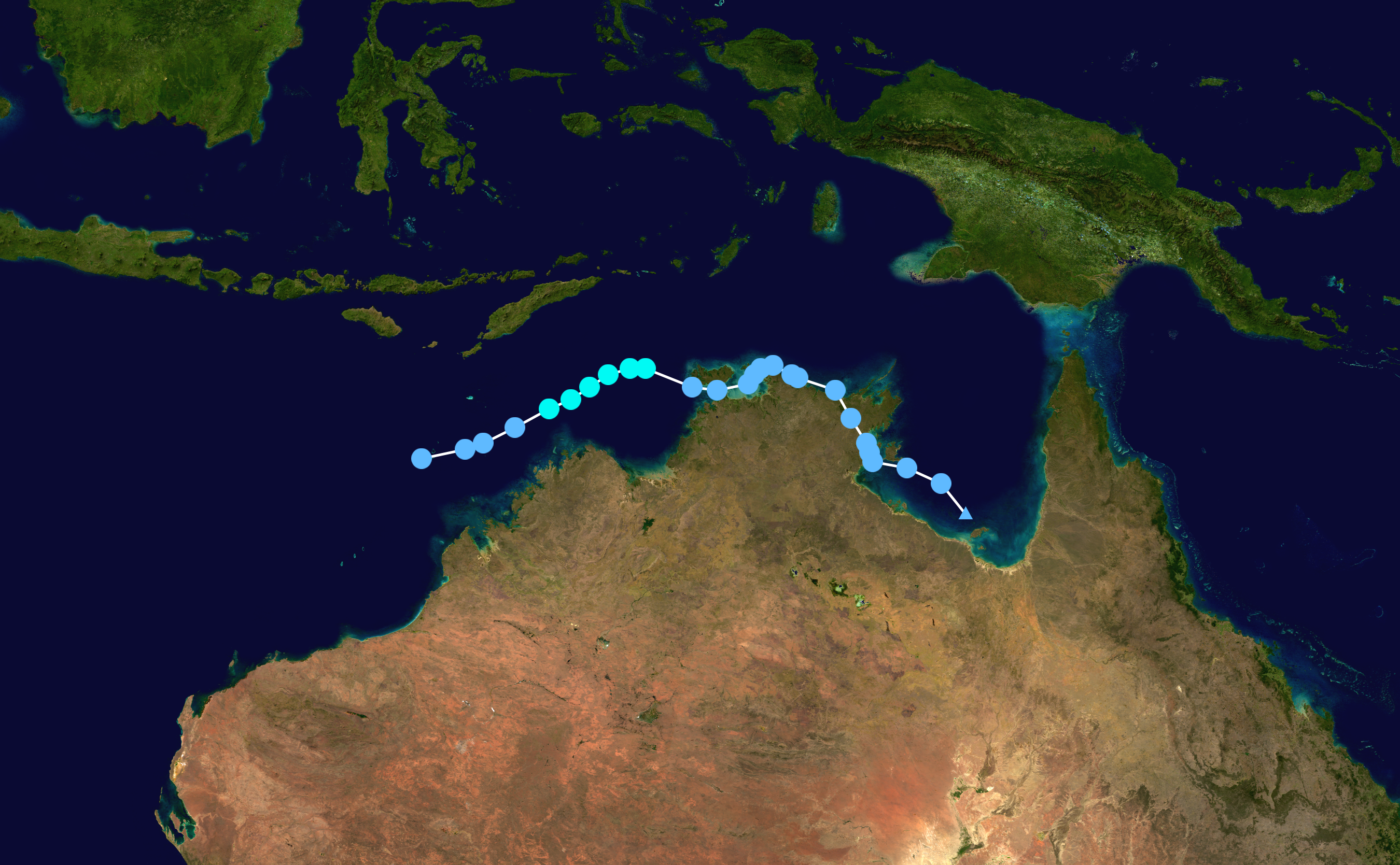
- Duration: November 30 – December 6
- Peak intensity: 65 km/h (40 mph) (10-min); 996 hPa (mbar)

A tropical low was identified in the southern Gulf of Carpentaria on 1 December, moving steadily northwest. It soon moved over land, re-emerging off the Northern Territory coast on 3 December. Late on 4 December, the low reached tropical cyclone status, receiving the name Amelia as it moved west-southwest through the Timor Sea. Soon afterwards, however, the system fell below cyclone intensity. It drifted west-southwest over the next few days, dissipating on 6 December.

=== Tropical Cyclone 04U ===
- Category 1 tropical cyclone (Australian scale)
- Tropical storm (SSHWS)
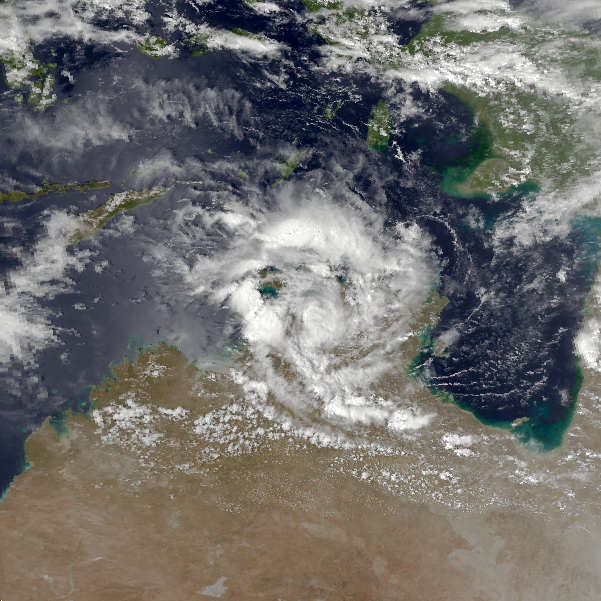
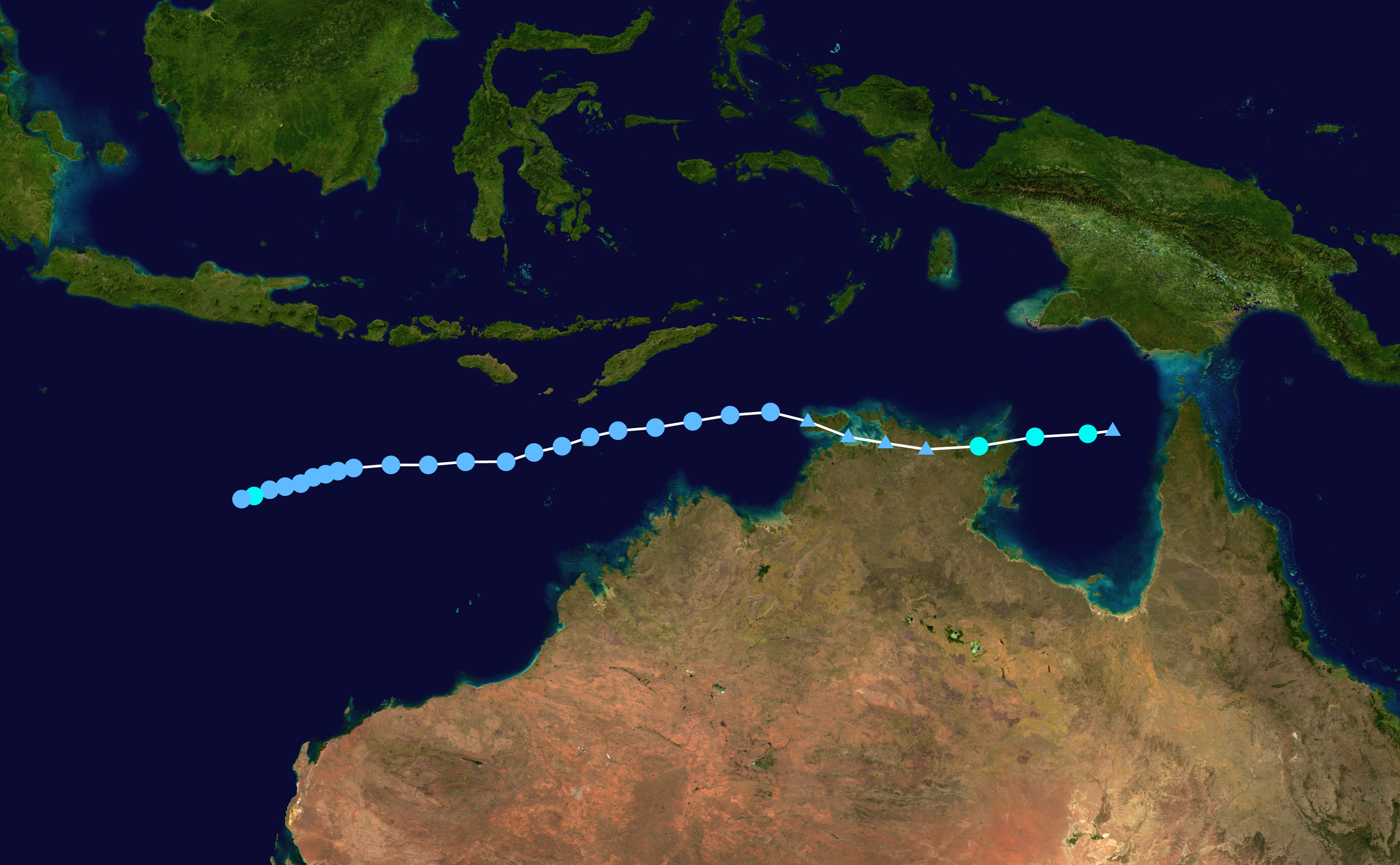
- Duration: December 19 – December 23
- Peak intensity: 85 km/h (50 mph) (10-min); 988 hPa (mbar)

A tropical low formed in a weak monsoon trough over the Gulf of Carpentaria early on 20 December. It moved westward and intensified, becoming a cyclone later that day, although it did not receive a name. At 1400 UTC on 20 December, it made landfall near Gove at its peak intensity with winds of 85 km/h (55 mph) and a minimum pressure of 990 hPa. The strongest winds were likely in the southern quadrants due to its rapid westward movement. The cyclone weakened as it moved over land, but emerged offshore near Darwin on the 21st. Now over water, it once again intensified to tropical cyclone intensity, reaching a secondary peak intensity with winds of 75 km/h (45 mph) and a pressure of 992 hPa. The system dissipated on 23 December.

At Gove, sustained winds of 115 km/h and gusts of over 148 km/h were recorded, the highest from the system. Extensive tree damage occurred in the Gove area, and some minor damage to ships occurred at the Nabalco Wharf.

=== Severe Tropical Cyclone Chris–Damia ===
- Category 3 severe tropical cyclone (Australian scale)
- Category 1 tropical cyclone (SSHWS)
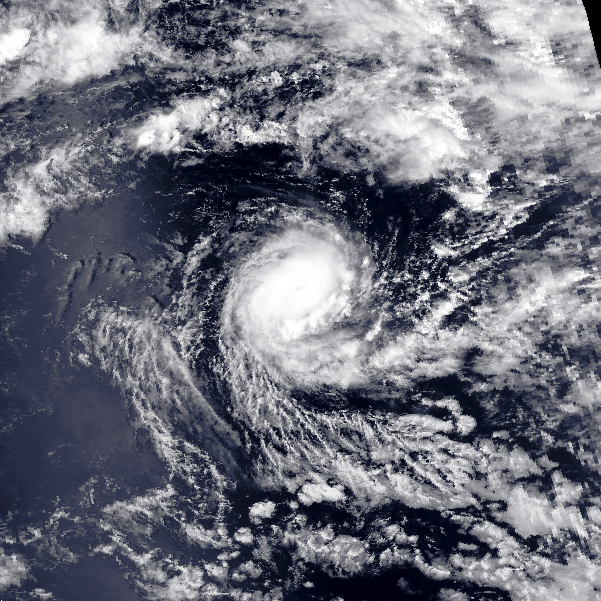
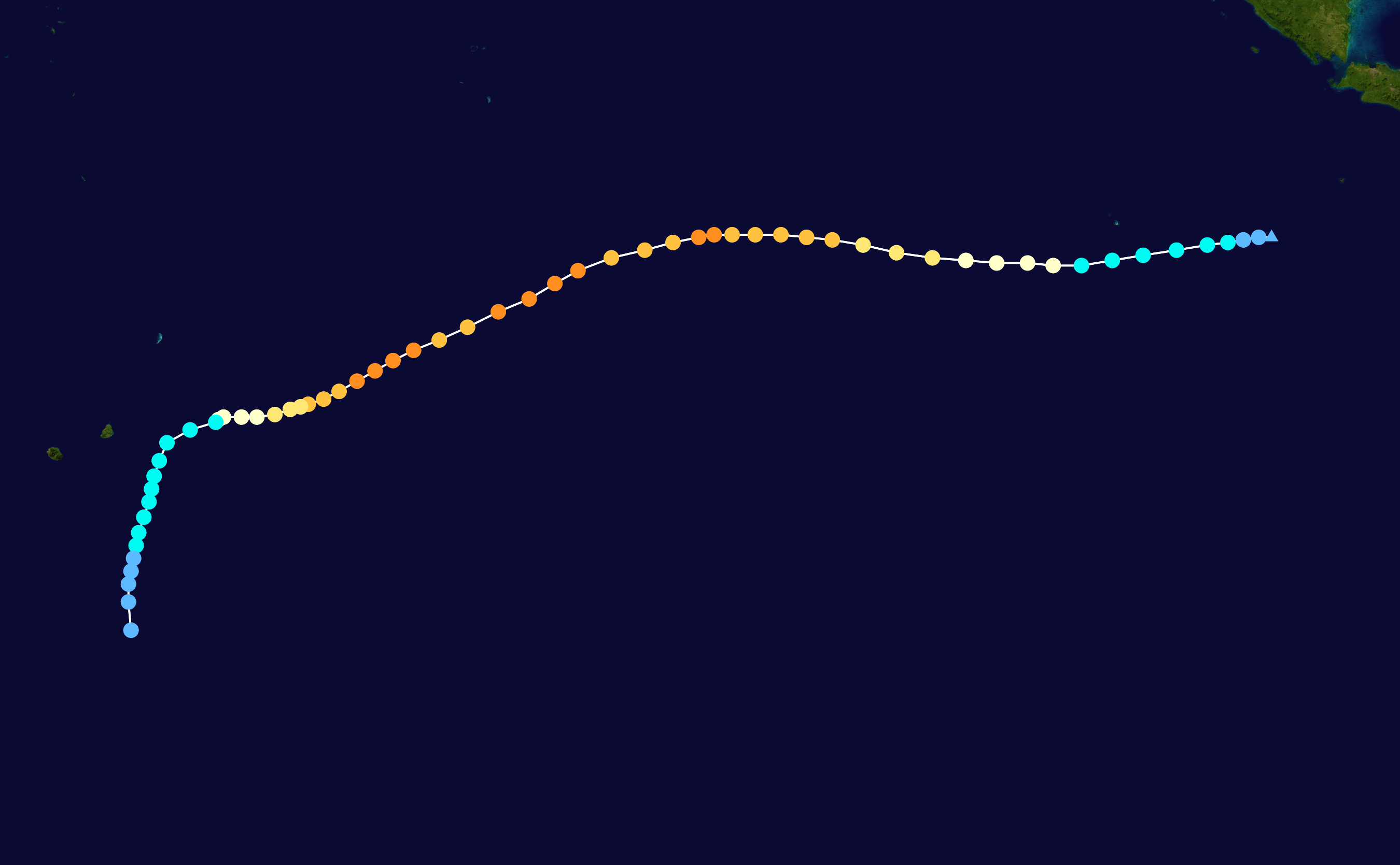
- Duration: January 5 – January 9 (Exited basin)
- Peak intensity: 150 km/h (90 mph) (10-min); 965 hPa (mbar)

Chris-Damia was the most intense storm of the season. Its precursor formed to the northwest of Christmas Island on 5 January, drifting slowly southwards. The system reached cycle intensity at 00:00 UTC on 7 January, receiving the name Chris. Over the next few days, Chris moved generally westwards as it steadily deepened, steered by a strong anticyclone located south of the storm. On 9 January, Chris passed 90°E and moved into the Météo-France area of responsibility, where it was renamed Damia. The system would later become the strongest tropical cyclone on record in the South-West Indian Ocean at the time, with an estimated pressure of 898 hPa (mbar).

=== Tropical Cyclone Bruno ===
- Category 2 tropical cyclone (Australian scale)
- Category 1 tropical cyclone (SSHWS)
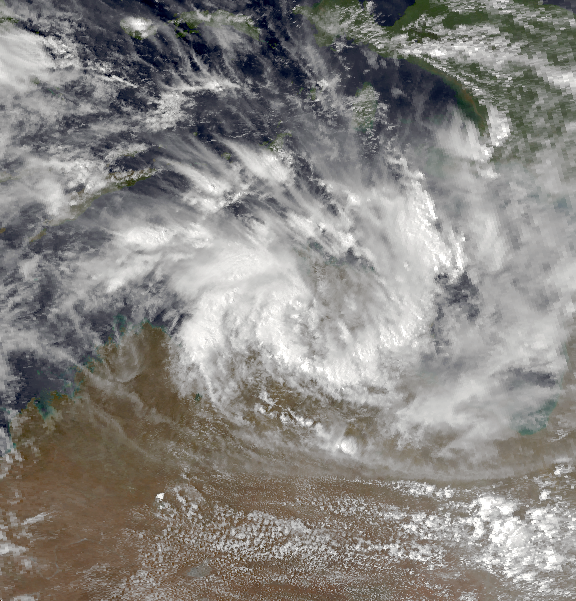
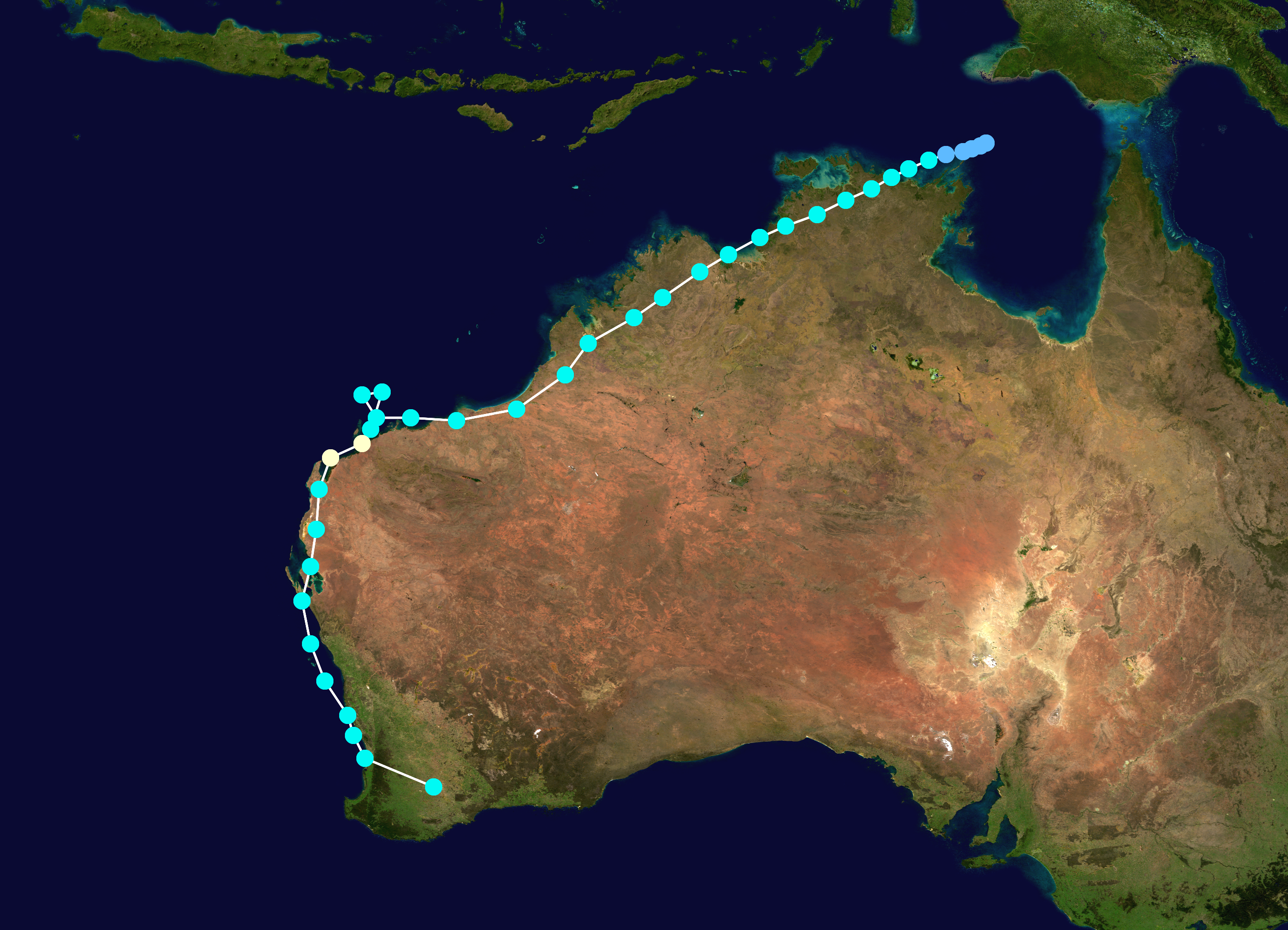
- Duration: January 10 – January 22
- Peak intensity: 95 km/h (60 mph) (10-min); 980 hPa (mbar)

On 10 January, a weak tropical low formed in the Gulf of Carpentaria from a monsoon trough. The low drifted slowly westwards, crossing the coast near Maningrida late on the 14th. Despite moving over land, the system continued to organise and reached cyclone intensity at 18:00 UTC on 15 January, while the centre was located near Wadeye. The storm, now named Bruno, continued to develop over the Joseph Bonaparte Gulf and reached an initial peak intensity with winds of 90 km/h (55 mph) and an estimated central pressure of 989 hPa (mbar) late on the 15th. Bruno made another landfall again at about 07:00 UTC on 16 January, turning towards the southwest and steadily weakening, although it continued to produce gale-force winds as it moved through the West Kimberley. After Bruno passed Port Hedland, the system moved out to sea and rapidly reintensified. Bruno reached its ultimate peak intensity at 15:00 UTC on 19 January, with winds of 90 km/h (55 mph) and an estimated central pressure of 980 hPa (mbar). The storm once again made landfall in the Exmouth Gulf later that day. A weakened Bruno moved out to sea again the next day but the system made its final landfall south of Perth on January 22 and dissipated soon after.

Bruno caused torrential rainfall to many areas of Western Australia, especially in the southwest where some stations set records for January rainfall. Severe flooding occurred in the southwest, with the Blackwood River reaching its highest level in over 25 years. Many bridges were washed away and there was extensive road and rail damage. A number of towns were flooded, with 75 houses being flooded in Nannup. Total damage was estimated at $10 million (1982 AUD, $10.9 million 1982 USD).

=== Tropical Cyclone Daphne–Fifi ===
- Category 2 tropical cyclone (Australian scale)
- Tropical storm (SSHWS)
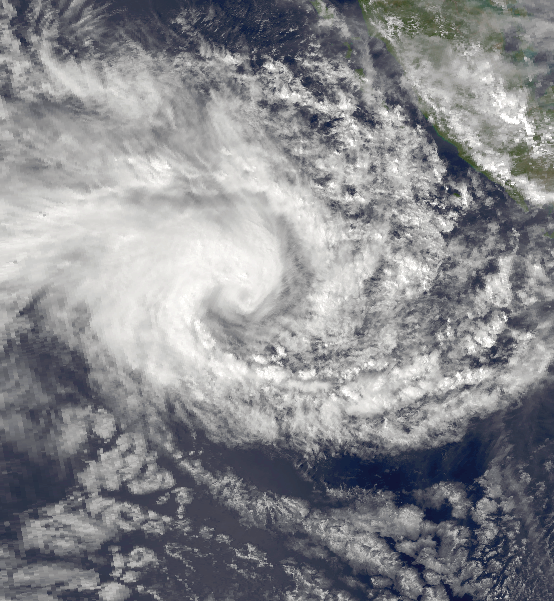
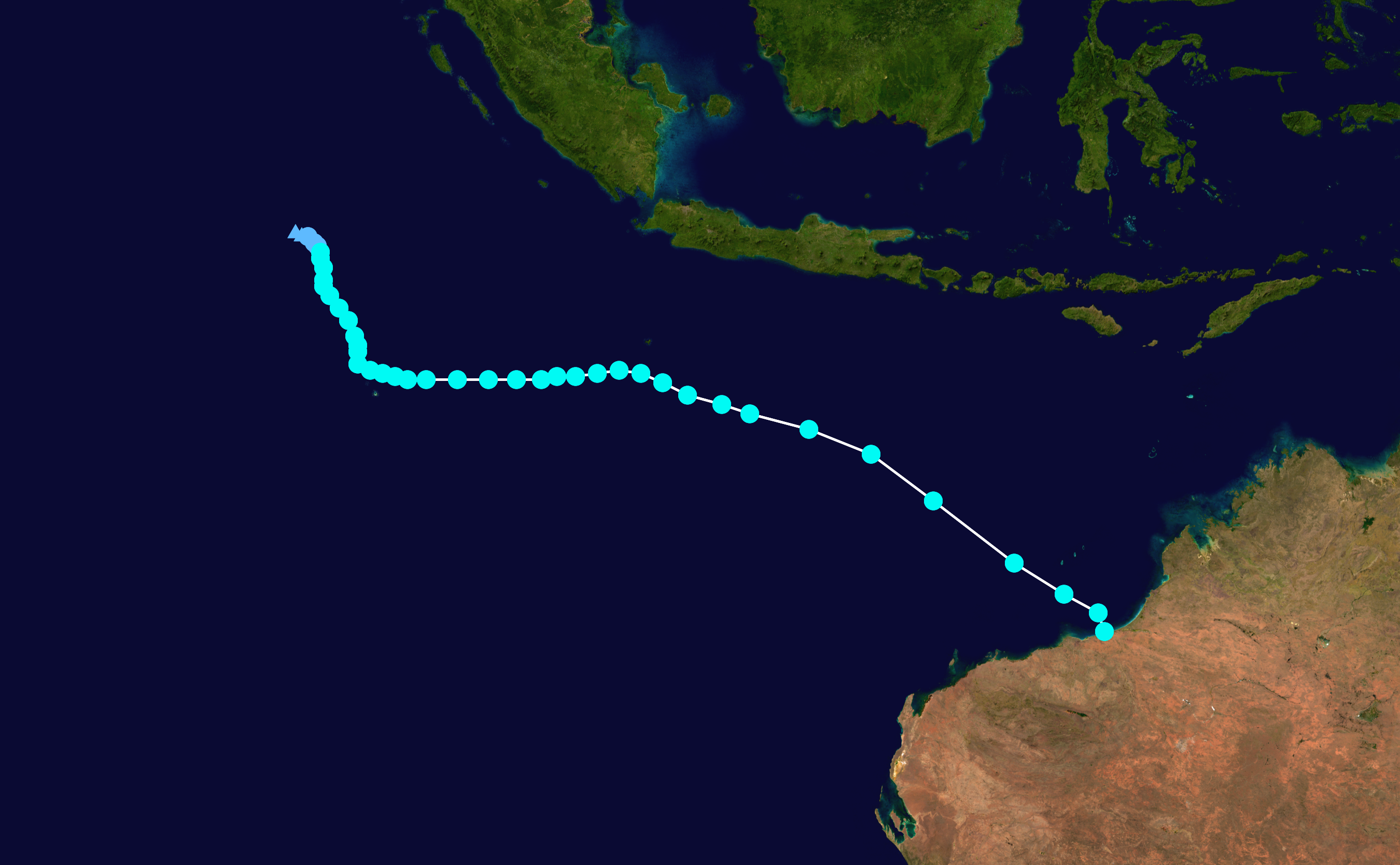
- Duration: January 11 – January 21
- Peak intensity: 95 km/h (60 mph) (10-min); 986 hPa (mbar)

Operationally considered two separate cyclones, Daphne-Fifi developed from the same monsoon trough that also spawned Cyclones Bruno and Errol. The system was first identified on 11 January. It drifted southeast and became a tropical cyclone at 09:00 UTC the next day. Daphne-Fifi slowly intensified as it moved towards the Cocos (Keeling) Islands. Curving towards the east, Daphne-Fifi reached its peak intensity early on 16 January with peak winds of 95 km/h (60 mph) and an estimated central pressure of 986 hPa (mbar). On the 19th, the system accelerated towards the southeast and weakened, dissipating a few days later as it crossed the Western Australian coast. The storm caused no damage or effects to land apart from disruption to shipping operations at Christmas Island.

=== Tropical Cyclone Errol ===
- Category 2 tropical cyclone (Australian scale)
- Tropical storm (SSHWS)
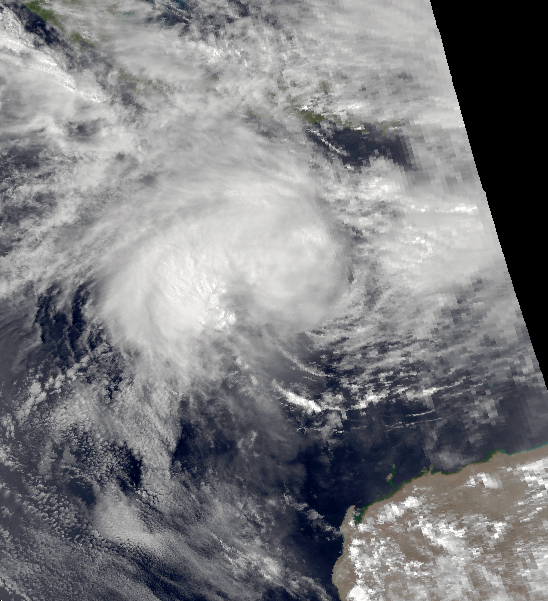
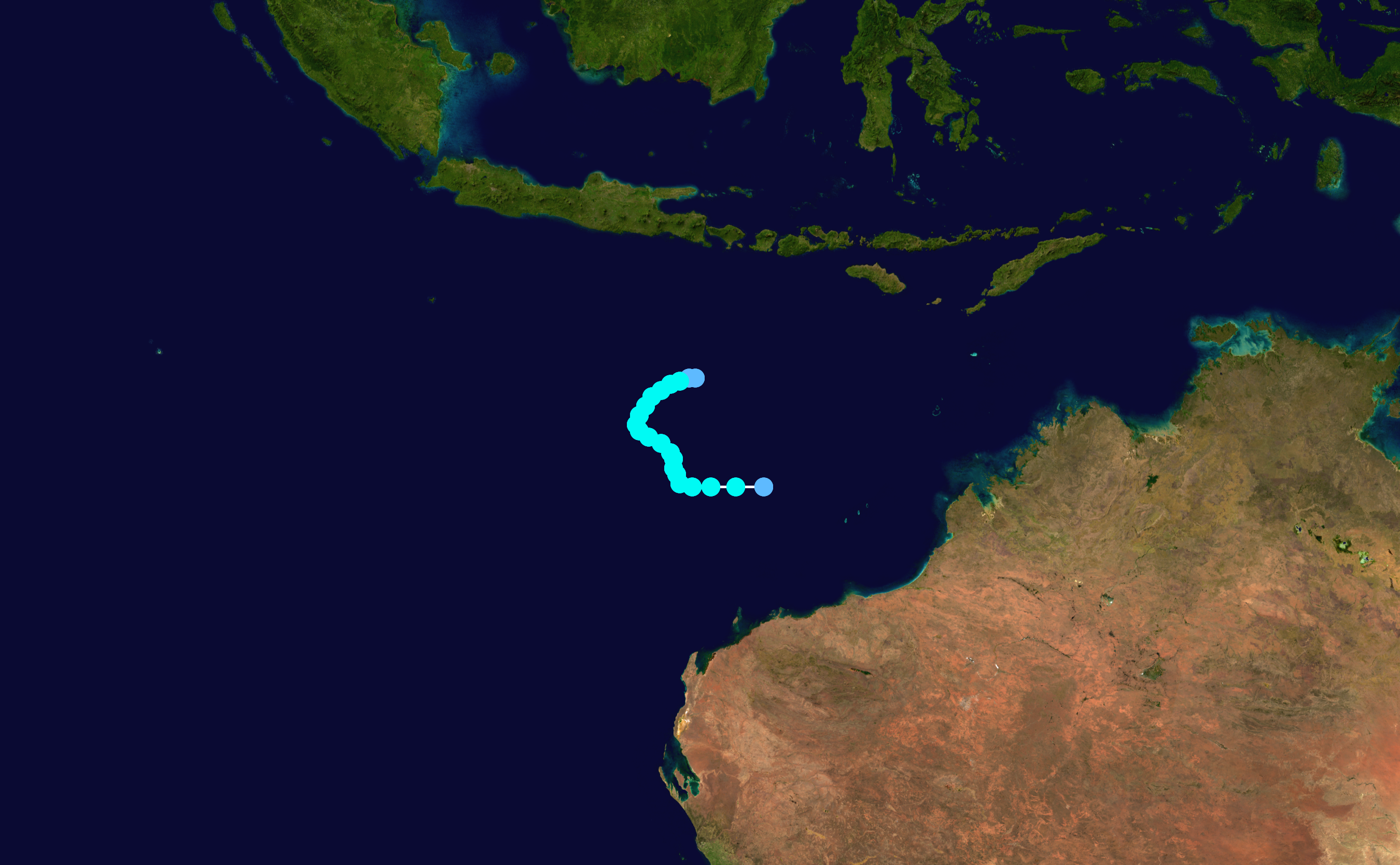
- Duration: January 11 – January 18
- Peak intensity: 100 km/h (65 mph) (10-min); 980 hPa (mbar)

Errol first became a tropical low on 11 January. After developing, the system moved in a general southwest to west direction, becoming a tropical cyclone at 00:00 UTC on the 13th. Errol slowly intensified over the coming days, reaching its peak intensity on 15 January with winds of 100 km/h (60 mph) and an estimated central pressure of 980 hPa (mbar) as it recurved towards the southeast. After peaking, the storm weakened and Errol merged with Cyclone Bruno on the 18 January. The storm caused flood damage in Western Australia.

=== Tropical Cyclone Abigail ===
- Category 2 tropical cyclone (Australian scale)
- Category 1 tropical cyclone (SSHWS)
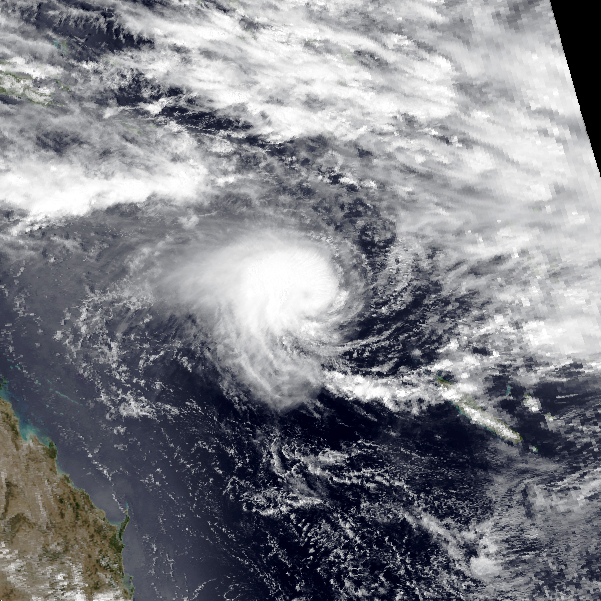
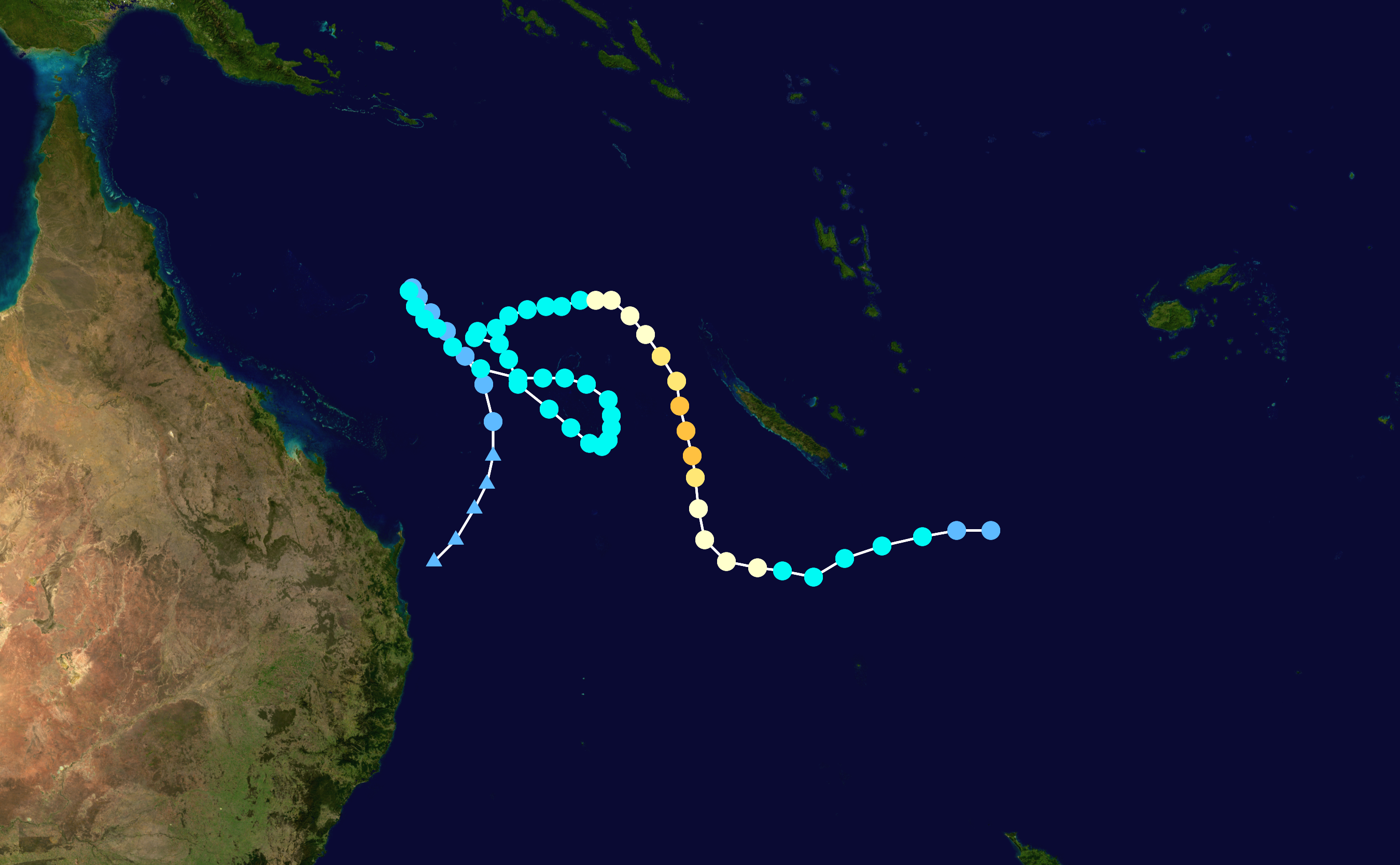
- Duration: January 22 – February 1 (Exited basin)
- Peak intensity: 110 km/h (70 mph) (10-min); 979 hPa (mbar)

The first cyclone of the season to affect Queensland, Abigail originated from a low that developed off of the South East Queensland coast on 22 January. For the next 3 days, the low moved northeast, and then northwest, slowly intensifying. On 25 January, the low turned towards the southeast, becoming a cyclone the following night. During the next 3 days, Abigail executed a cyclonic loop, and it made another major turn towards the east-northeast on the 30th. Abigail reached its highest intensity in the Australian region on 1 February with winds of 120 km/h (75 mph) and an estimated central pressure of 975 hPa (mbar), moving out of the basin immediately after. Abigail caused no damage or fatalities in the Australian region.

=== Tropical Cyclone Graham ===
- Category 2 tropical cyclone (Australian scale)
- Tropical storm (SSHWS)
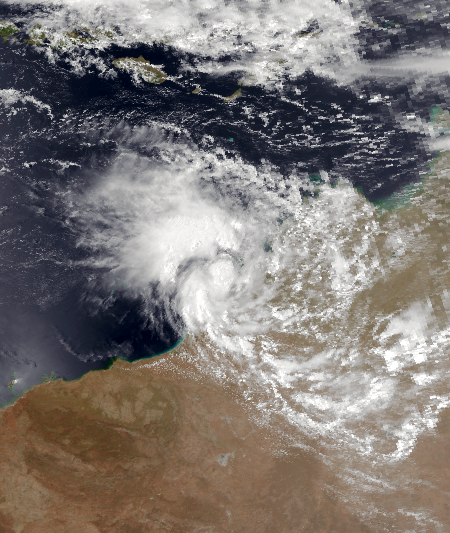
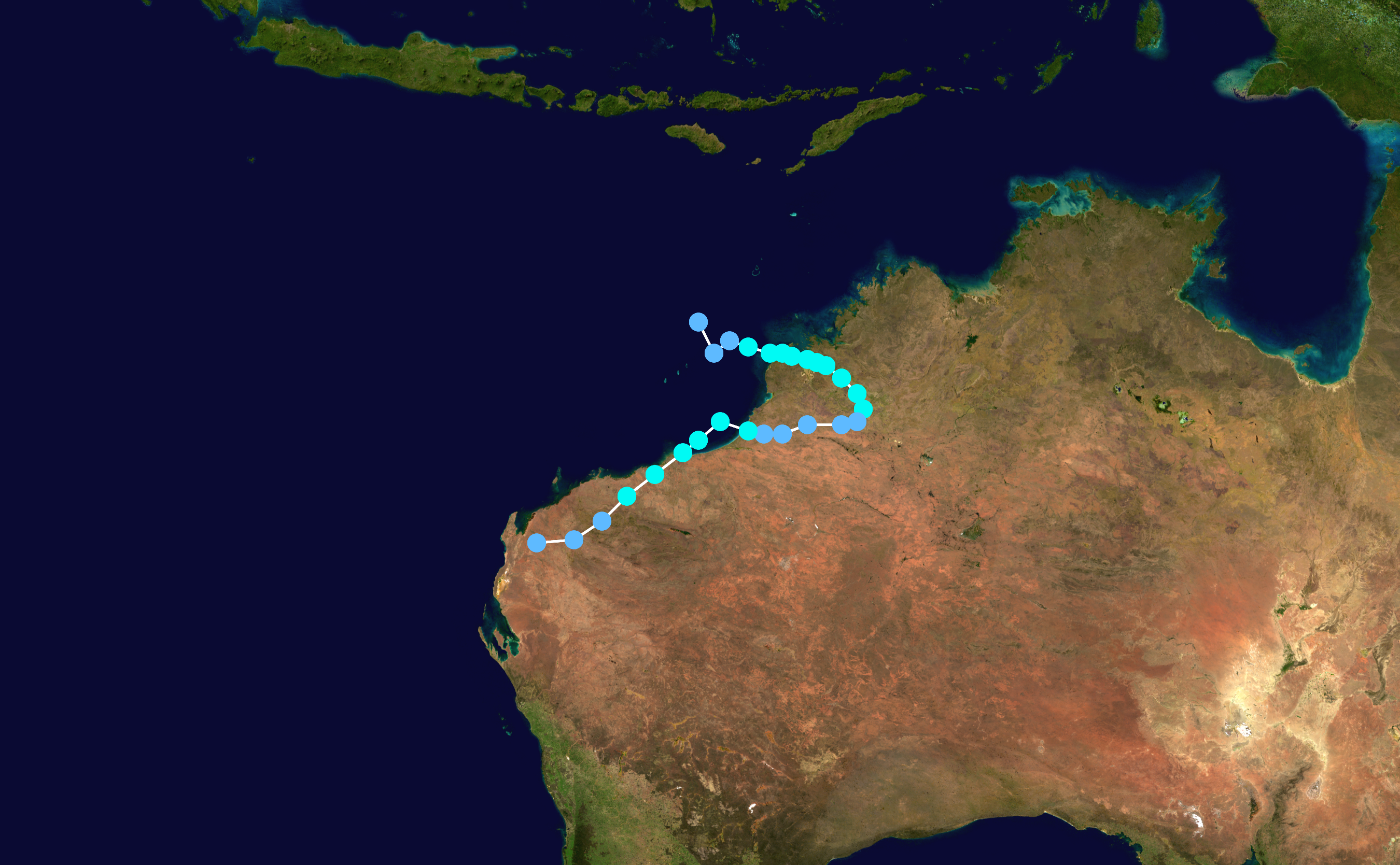
- Duration: January 27 – February 2
- Peak intensity: 100 km/h (65 mph) (10-min); 980 hPa (mbar)

A low formed just south of the Intertropical Convergence Zone on January 27. Moving eastward, it reached cyclone status before it made landfall in the Kimberley Region the next day. Weakening to a tropical low, it recurved to the west on the 29th, steered by a developing ridge of high pressure. Early on January 31, the low moved out to sea and quickly redeveloped before once again turning to the southwest and nearing the coast. Just before it made its second landfall near Port Hedland, Graham peaked with winds of 100 km/h (60 mph) and a minimum central pressure of 980 hPa (mbar). During the January 28–30 period, Graham caused extensive landfall over the Kimberley, with 178 mm recorded in Broome during a 24-hour period ending at 01:00 UTC on the 30th. After its second landfall, building and tree damage was reported at Pardoo Station.

=== Tropical Cyclone Coral ===
- Category 1 tropical cyclone (Australian scale)
- Tropical storm (SSHWS)
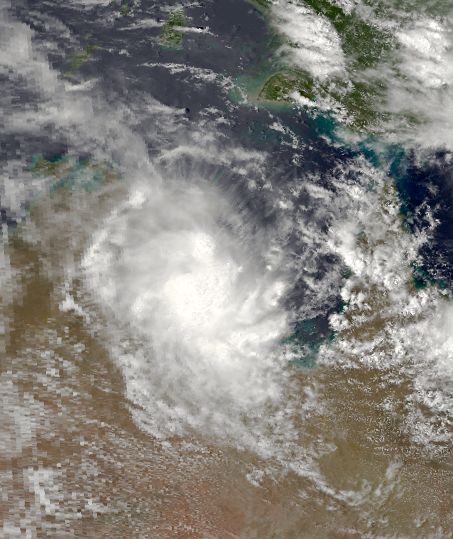
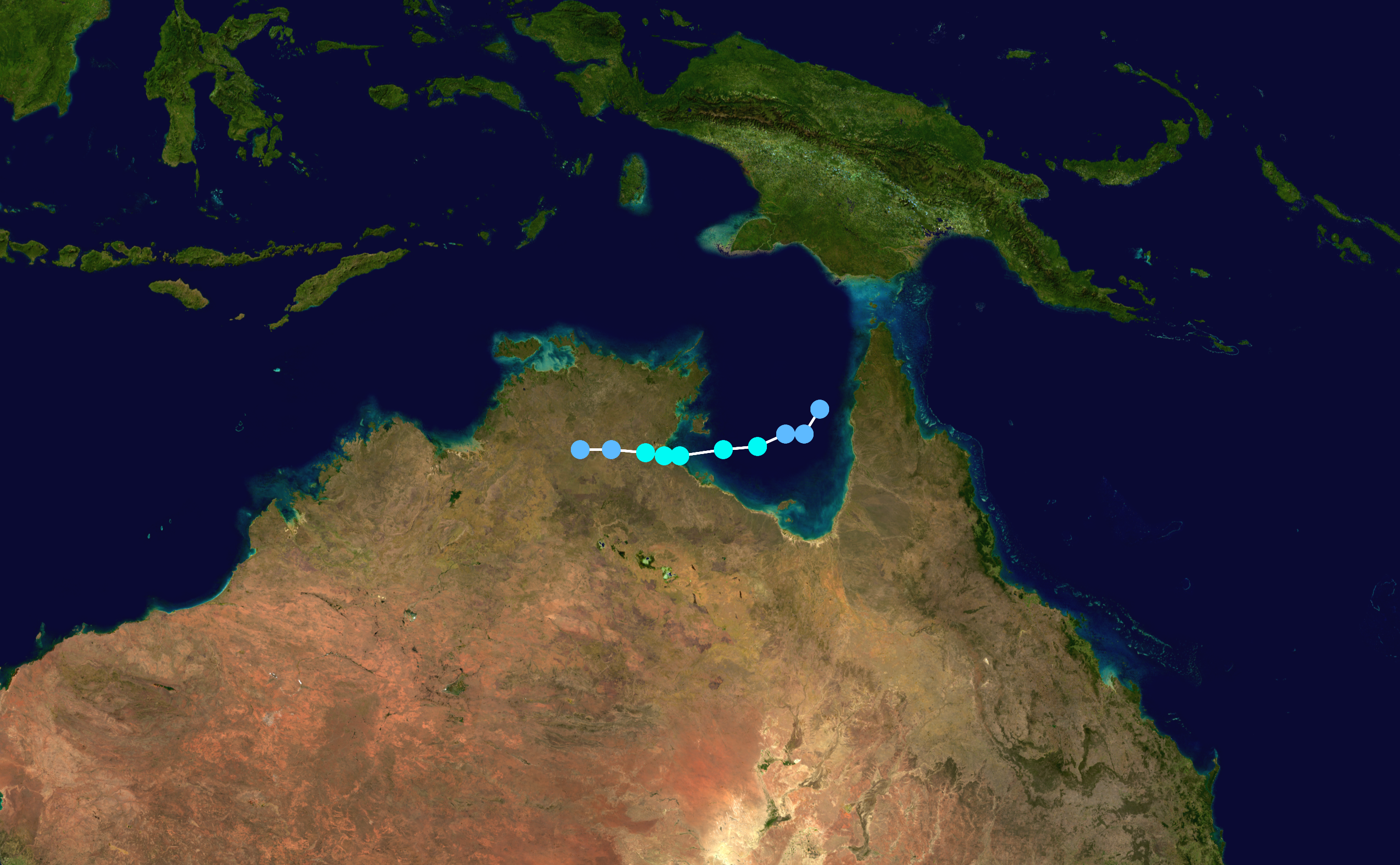
- Duration: February 4 – February 6
- Peak intensity: 65 km/h (40 mph) (10-min); 996 hPa (mbar)

Coral formed on 4 February in the Gulf of Carpentaria, reaching cyclone status later that day. It crossed the coast on 5 February and dissipated the following day.

=== Tropical Cyclone Harriet ===
- Category 2 tropical cyclone (Australian scale)
- Tropical storm (SSHWS)
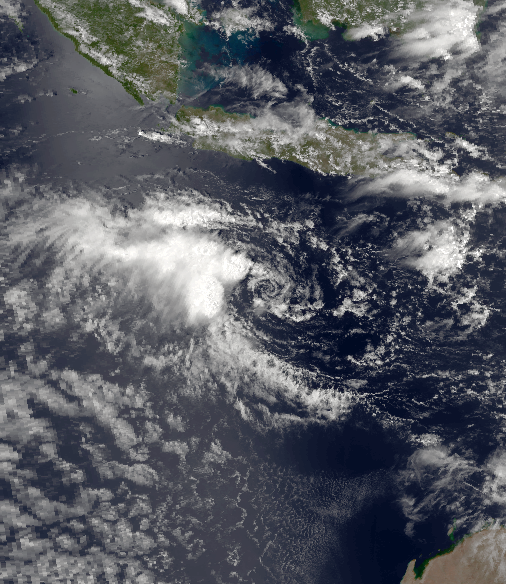
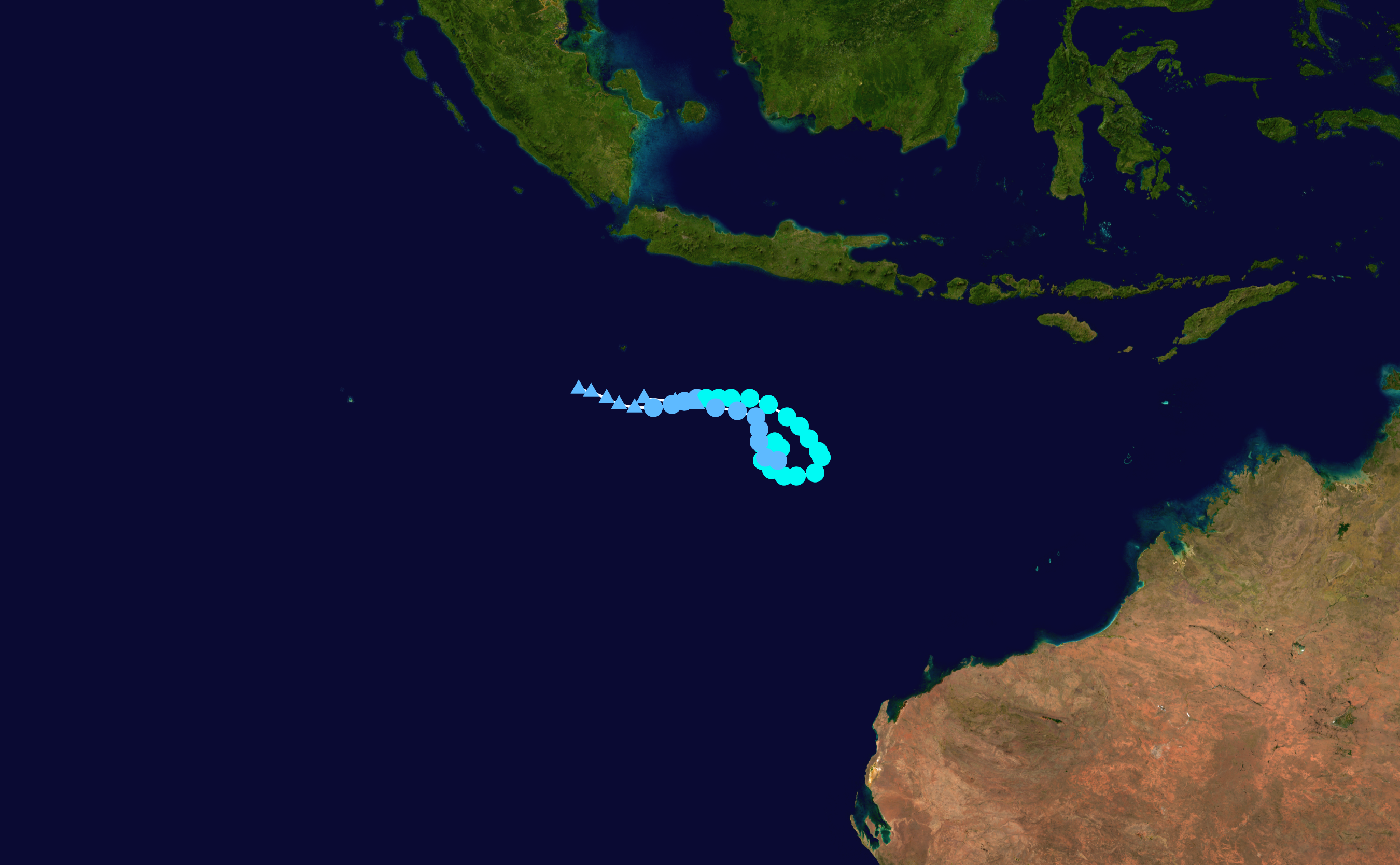
- Duration: February 12 – February 21
- Peak intensity: 95 km/h (60 mph) (10-min); 988 hPa (mbar)

=== Severe Tropical Cyclone Ian ===
- Category 3 severe tropical cyclone (Australian scale)
- Category 1 tropical cyclone (SSHWS)
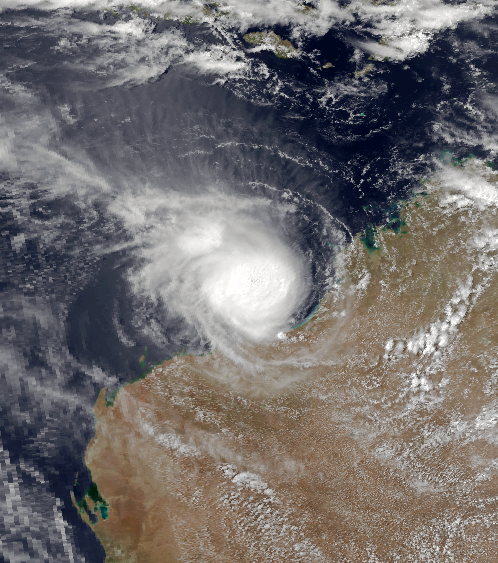
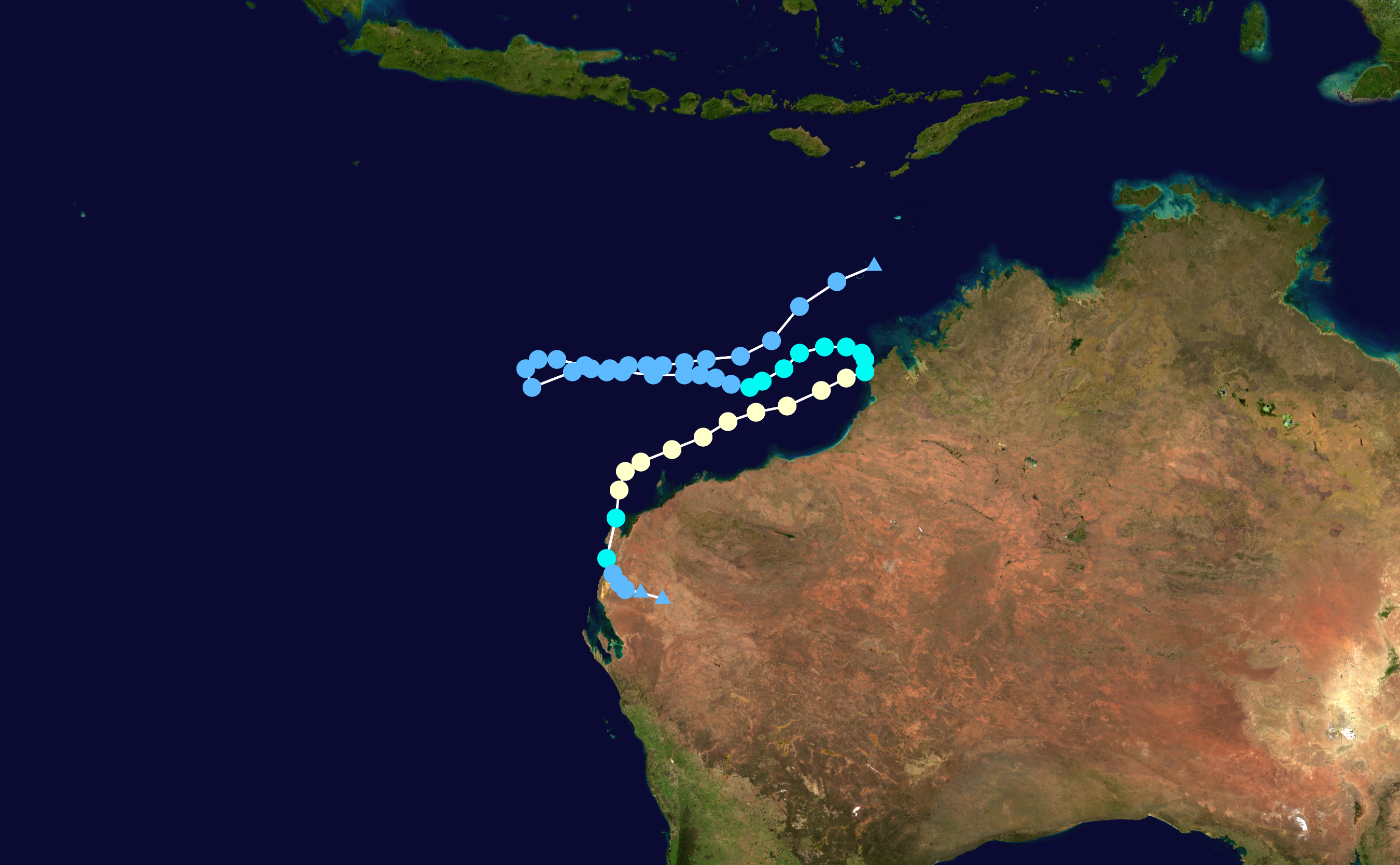
- Duration: February 23 – March 7
- Peak intensity: 150 km/h (90 mph) (10-min); 964 hPa (mbar)

=== Tropical Cyclone 23S ===
- Tropical storm (SSHWS)
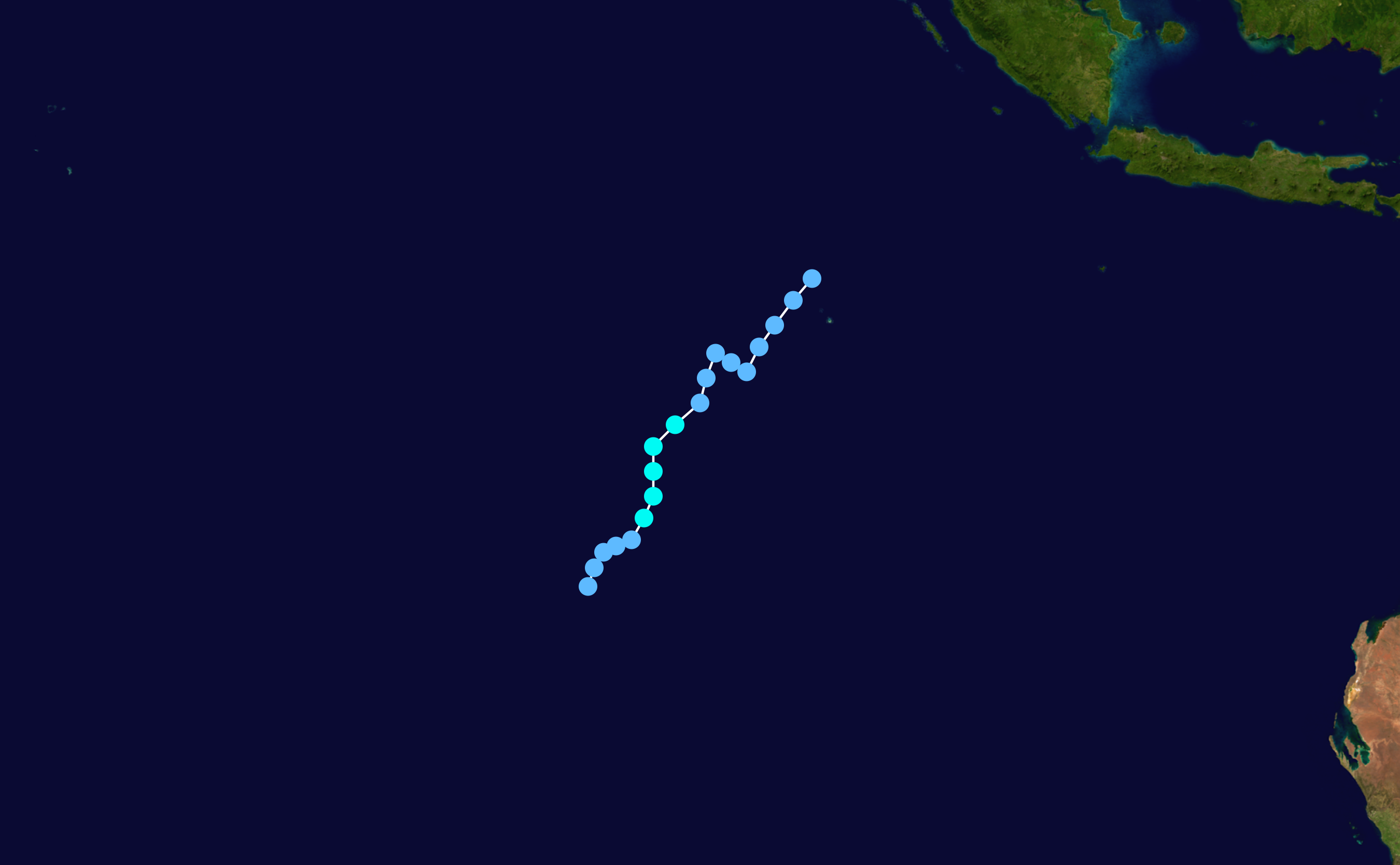
- Duration: March 15 – March 19
- Peak intensity: 75 km/h (45 mph) (1-min);

Tropical Storm 23S existed from March 15 to March 20, 1982. While it was designated by the Joint Typhoon Warning Center, it was not warned on by the Bureau of Meteorology. It later crossed into the South-West Indian Ocean.

=== Severe Tropical Cyclone Bernie ===
- Category 4 severe tropical cyclone (Australian scale)
- Category 3 tropical cyclone (SSHWS)
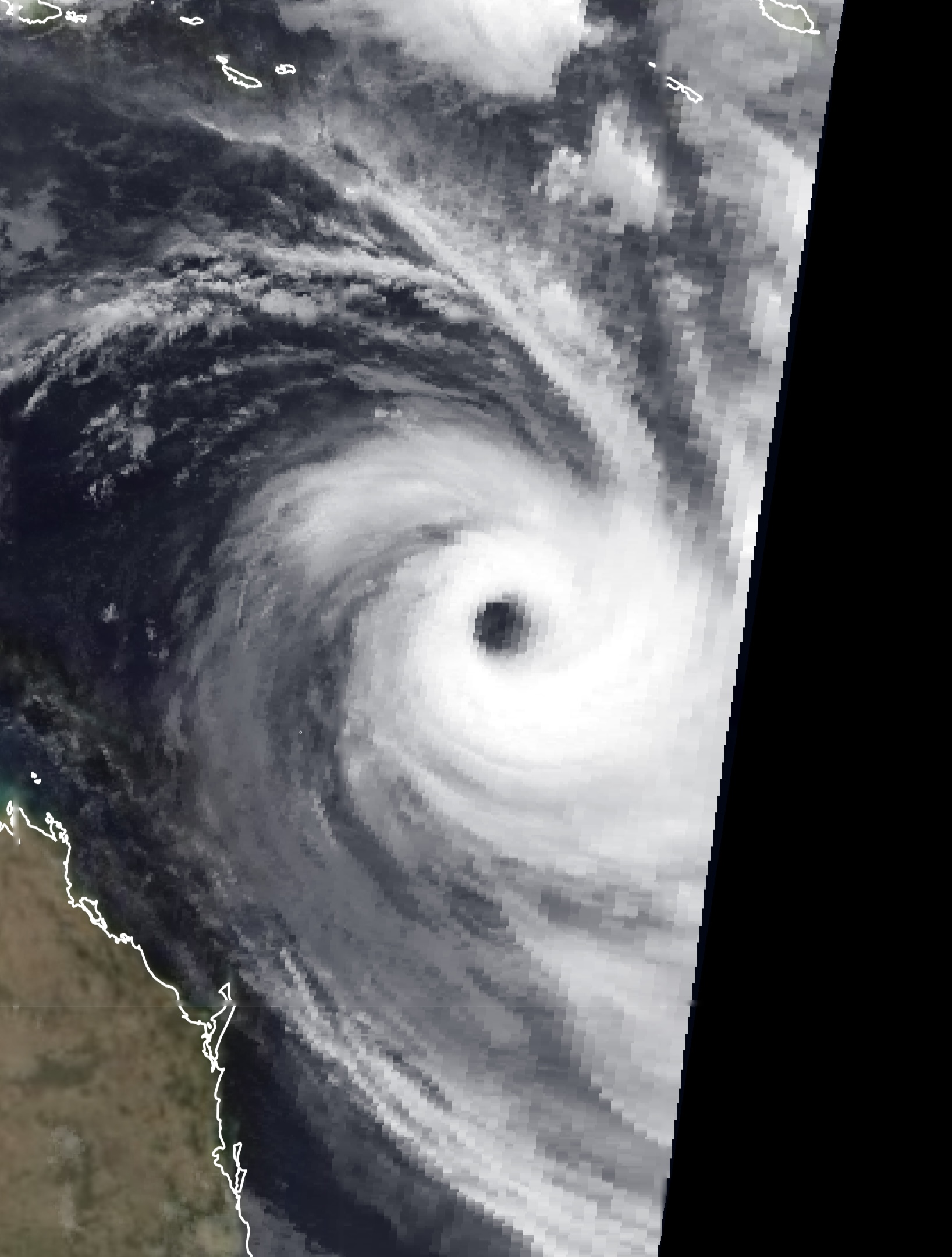
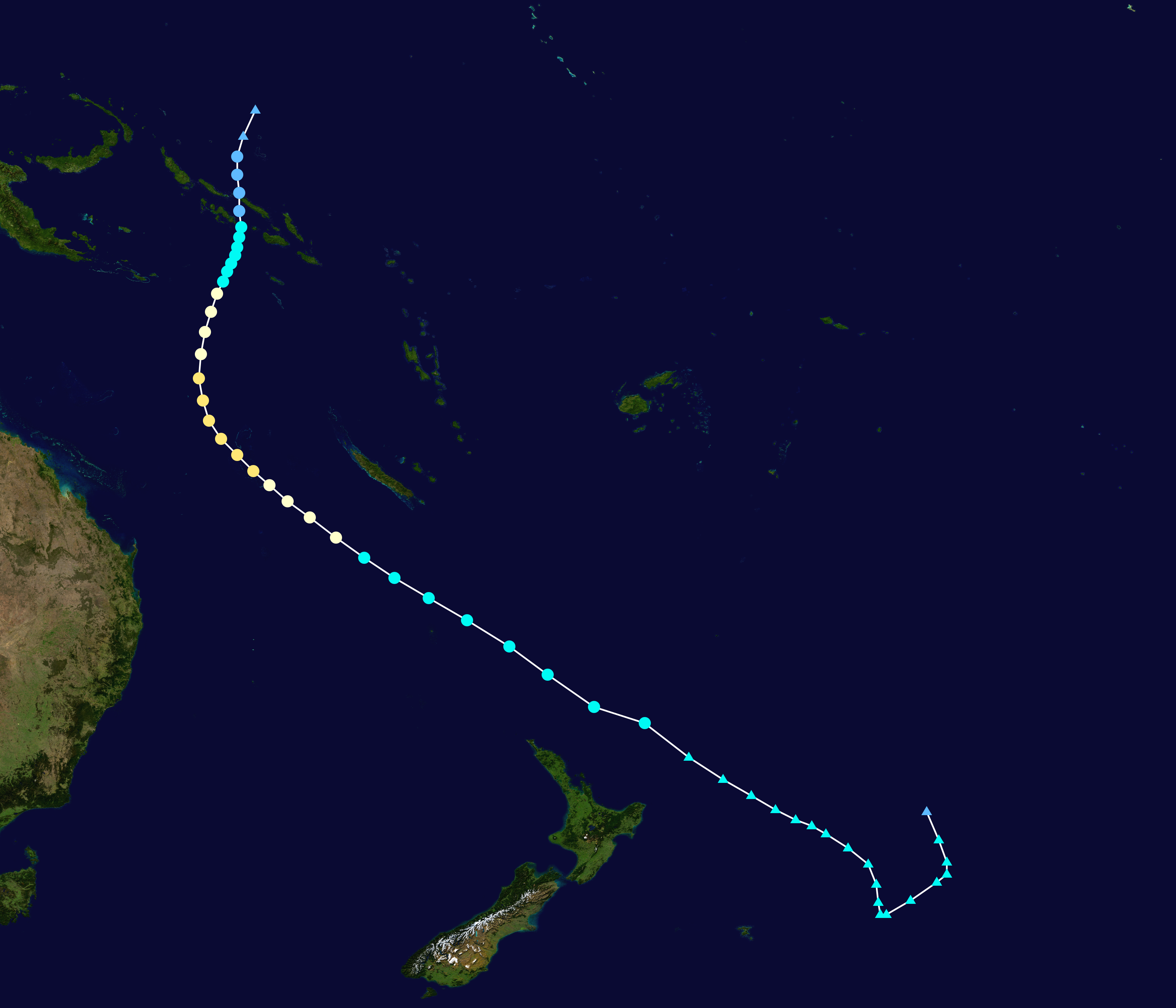
- Duration: April 1 – April 6 (Exited basin)
- Peak intensity: 185 km/h (115 mph) (10-min); 945 hPa (mbar)

=== Severe Tropical Cyclone Dominic ===
- Category 5 severe tropical cyclone (Australian scale)
- Category 3 tropical cyclone (SSHWS)
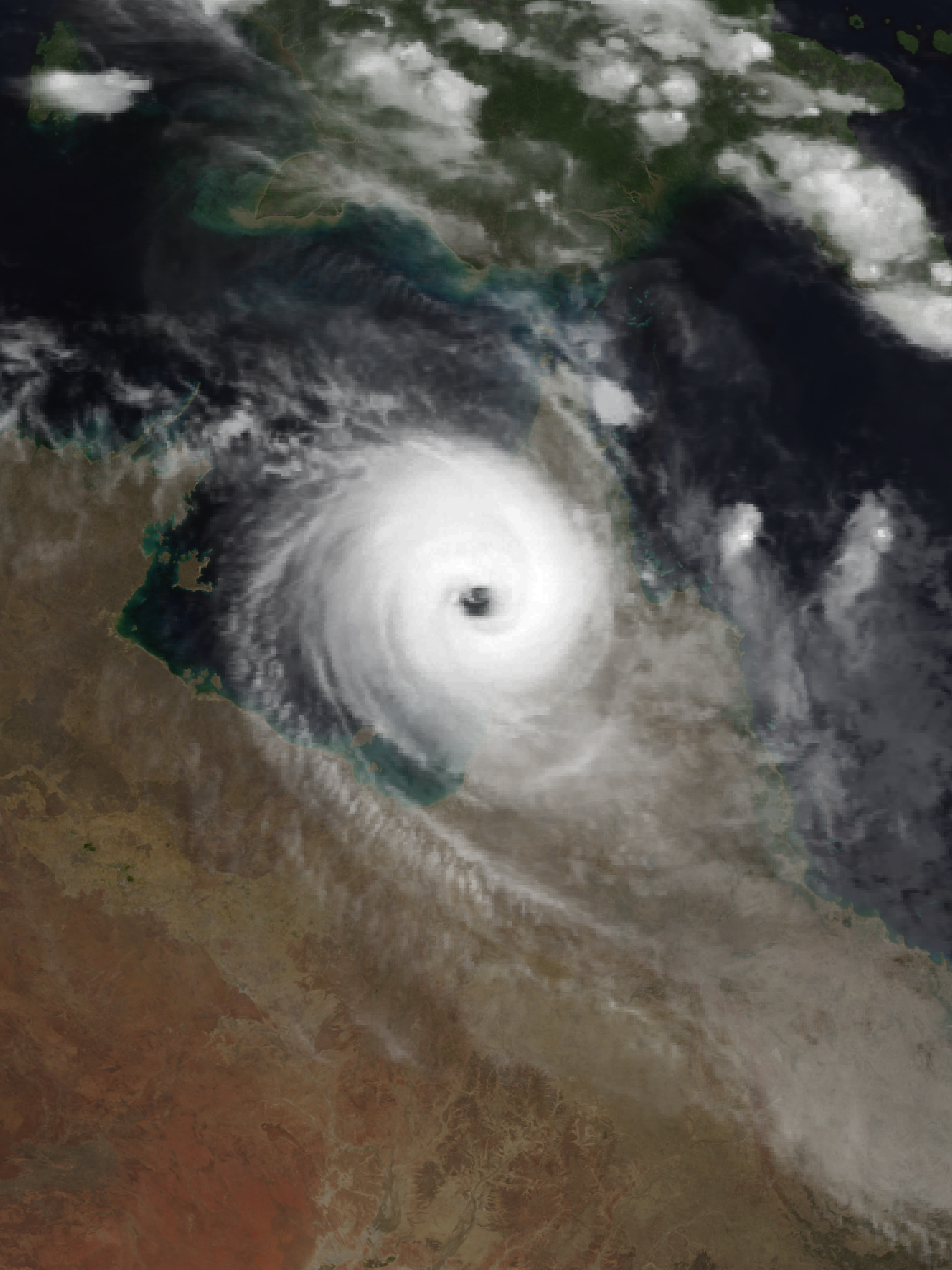
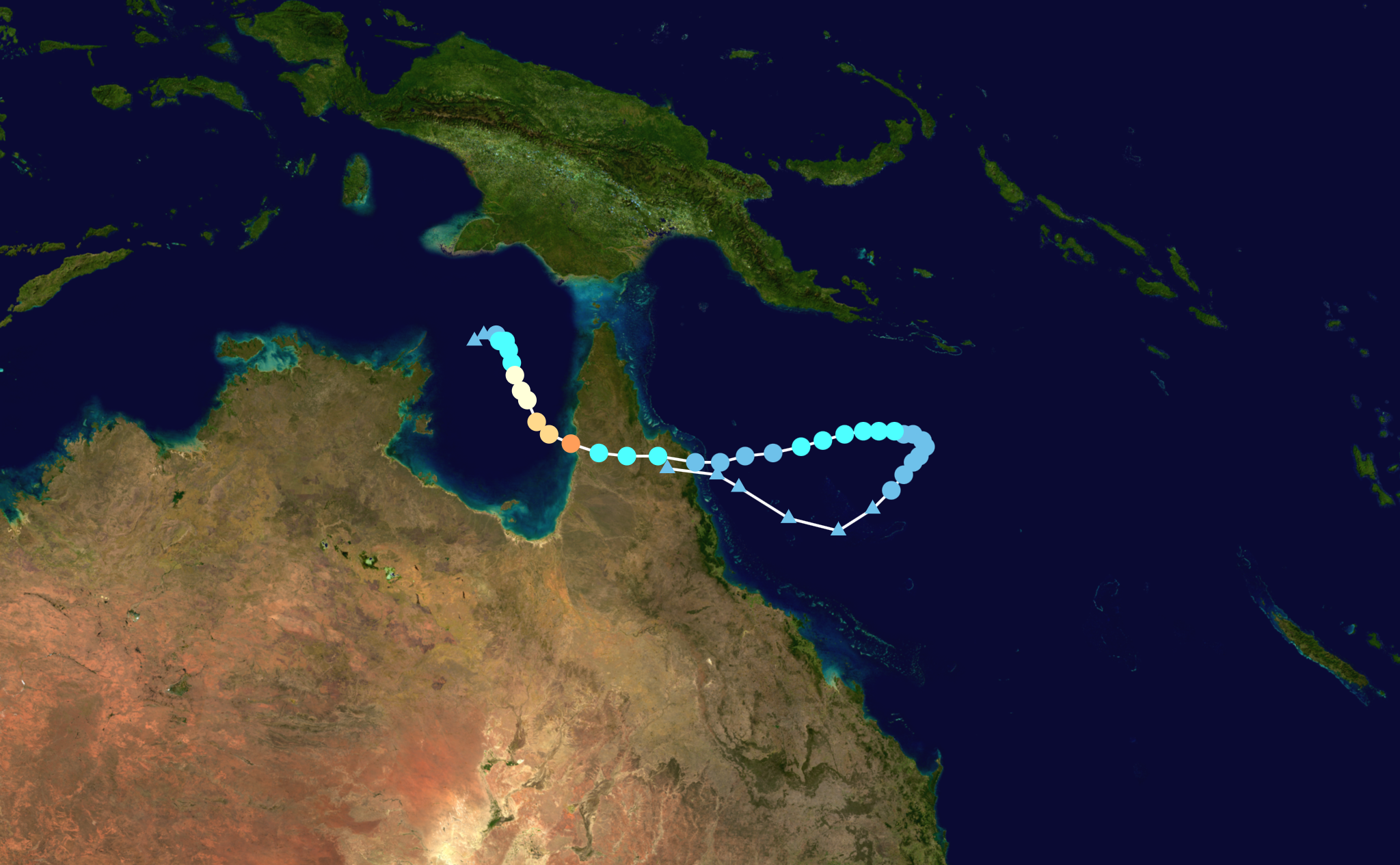
- Duration: April 4 – April 14
- Peak intensity: 215 km/h (130 mph) (10-min); 950 hPa (mbar)

Cyclone Dominic made landfall on April 7, 1982, near Cape Keerweer. Damage was done to buildings and power lines at Edward River Mission and Aurukun. Wind damage was seen in Darwin and the Northern Territory. The storm tide was 1 meter/3.3 ft at Weripa and 1.5 meter/5 ft at Karumba. The storm left 3.6 million dollars (1982 USD) in damage.

=== Tropical Cyclone Claudia ===
- Category 1 tropical cyclone (Australian scale)
- Tropical storm (SSHWS)
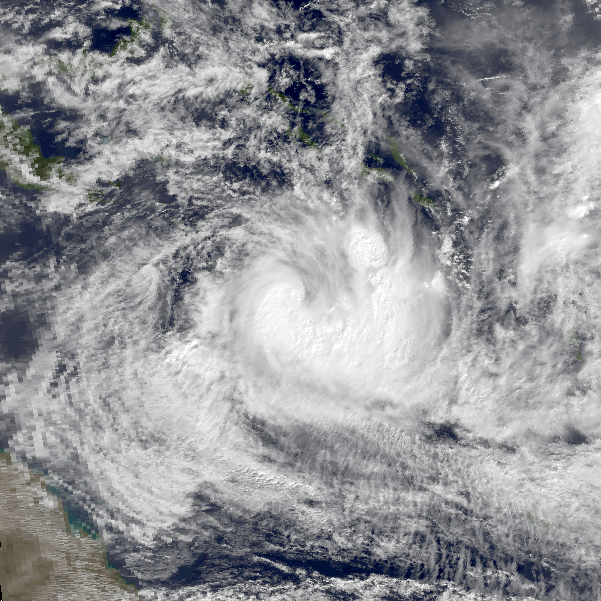
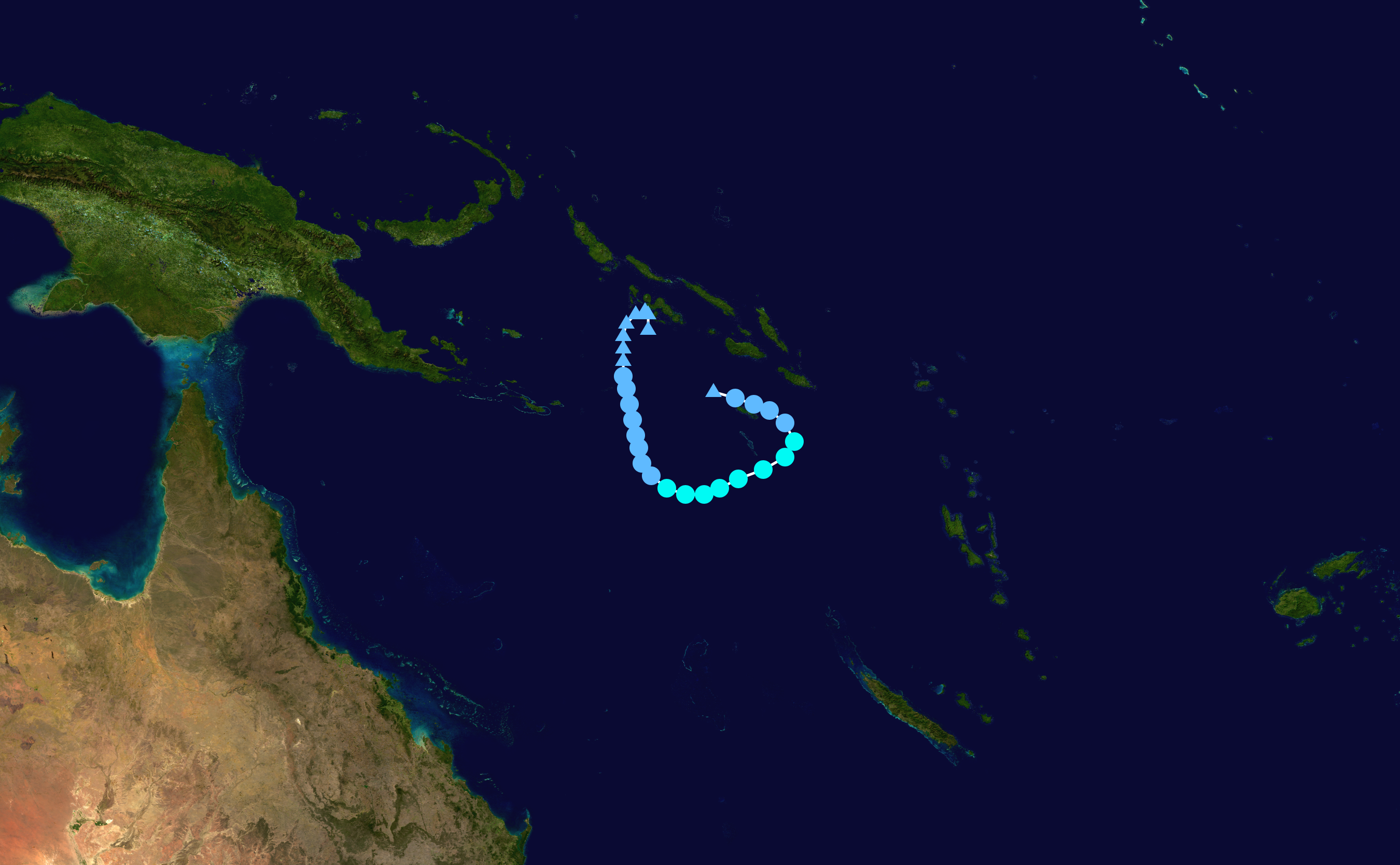
- Duration: May 14 – May 16 (Exited basin)
- Peak intensity: 75 km/h (45 mph) (10-min); 992 hPa (mbar)

== See also ==
- Atlantic hurricane seasons: 1981, 1982
- Eastern Pacific hurricane seasons: 1981, 1982
- Western Pacific typhoon seasons: 1981, 1982
- North Indian Ocean cyclone seasons: 1981, 1982
