= 1980 hurricane season =

1980 hurricane season may refer to:

- The 1980 Atlantic hurricane season
- The 1980 Pacific hurricane season
