= 1980 North Indian Ocean cyclone season =

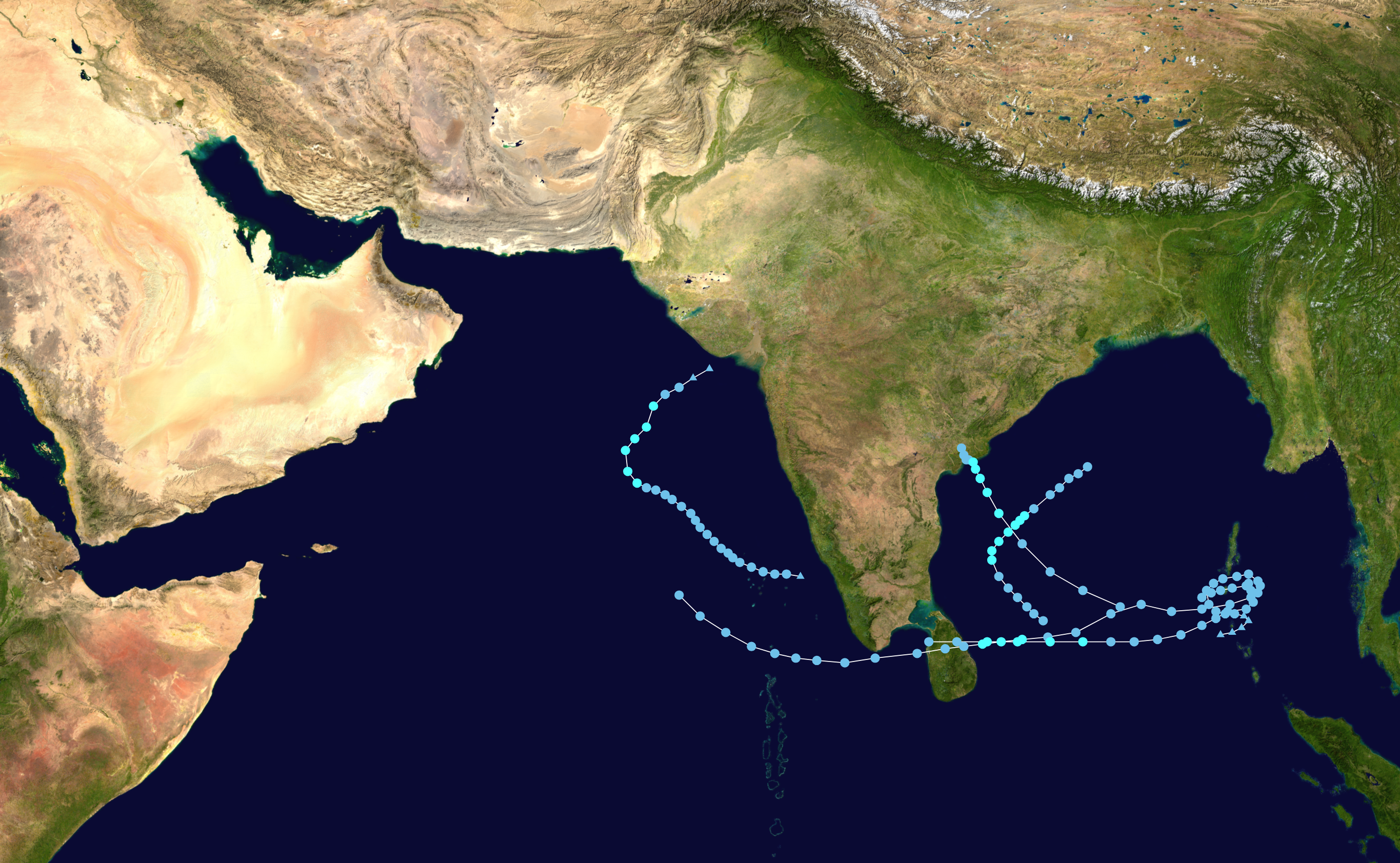
- Season summary map

Seasonal boundaries
- First system formed: May 15, 1980
- Last system dissipated: December 17, 1980

Strongest storm
- Name: 02B
  - Maximum winds: 75 km/h (45 mph) (3-minute sustained)
  - Lowest pressure: 996 hPa (mbar)

Seasonal statistics
- Depressions: 14
- Cyclonic storms: 2 (3 unofficial)
- Total fatalities: Unknown
- Total damage: Unknown

Related articles
- 1980 Atlantic hurricane season; 1980 Pacific hurricane season; 1980 Pacific typhoon season

The 1980 North Indian Ocean cyclone season was part of the annual cycle of tropical cyclone formation. The season has no official bounds but cyclones form between April and December. These dates conventionally delimit the period of each year when most tropical cyclones form in the northern Indian Ocean. There are two main seas in the North Indian Ocean—the Bay of Bengal to the east of the Indian subcontinent and the Arabian Sea to the west of India. The official Regional Specialized Meteorological Centre in this basin is the India Meteorological Department (IMD), while the Joint Typhoon Warning Center (JTWC) releases unofficial advisories. An average of five tropical cyclones form in the North Indian Ocean every season with peaks in May and November. Cyclones occurring between the meridians 45°E and 100°E are included in the season by the IMD.

== Systems ==
=== Cyclonic Storm 01B ===
- Cyclonic storm (IMD)
- Tropical storm (SSHWS)
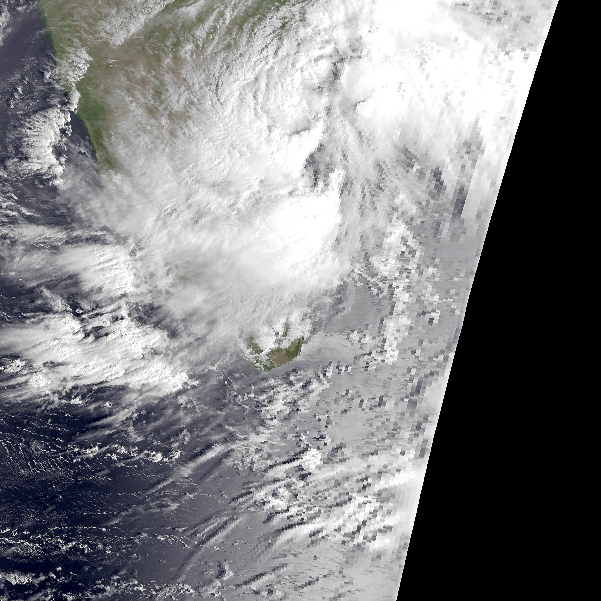
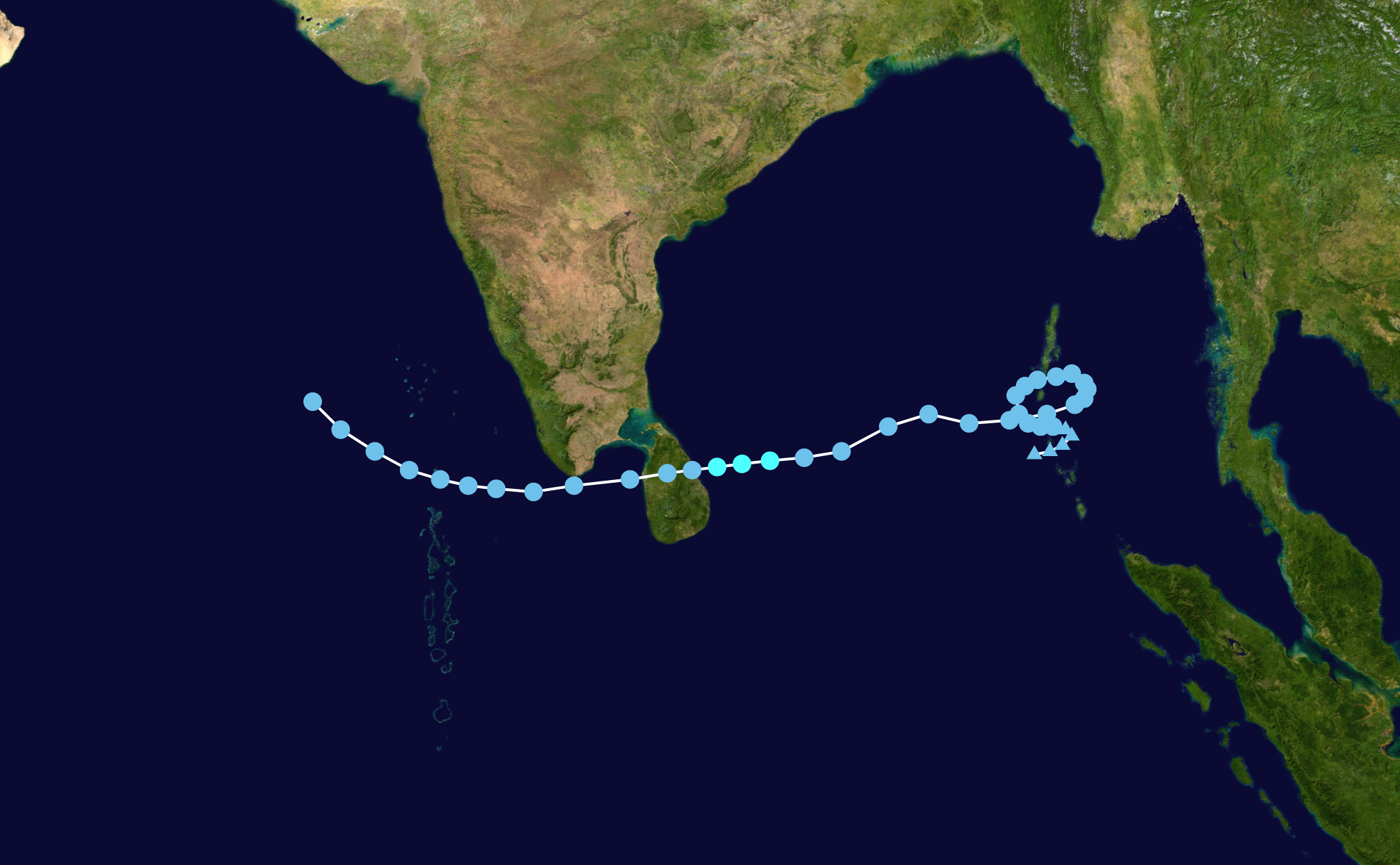
- Duration: October 10 – October 20
- Peak intensity: 65 km/h (40 mph) (3-min);

The first storm of the season began its life on October 10 in the Bay of Bengal. It executed an anticyclonic loop to the west, and became a tropical storm before hitting eastern Sri Lanka on the 17th. It continued westward, and ultimately dissipated over the Arabian Sea on the 20th.

=== Cyclonic Storm 02B ===
- Cyclonic storm (IMD)
- Tropical storm (SSHWS)
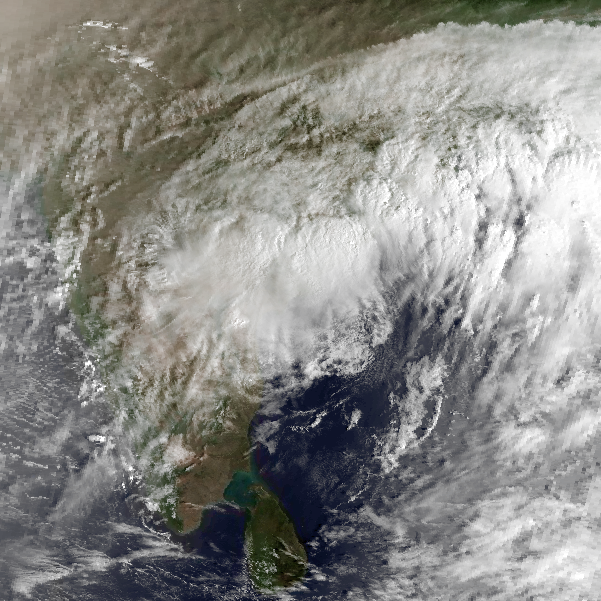
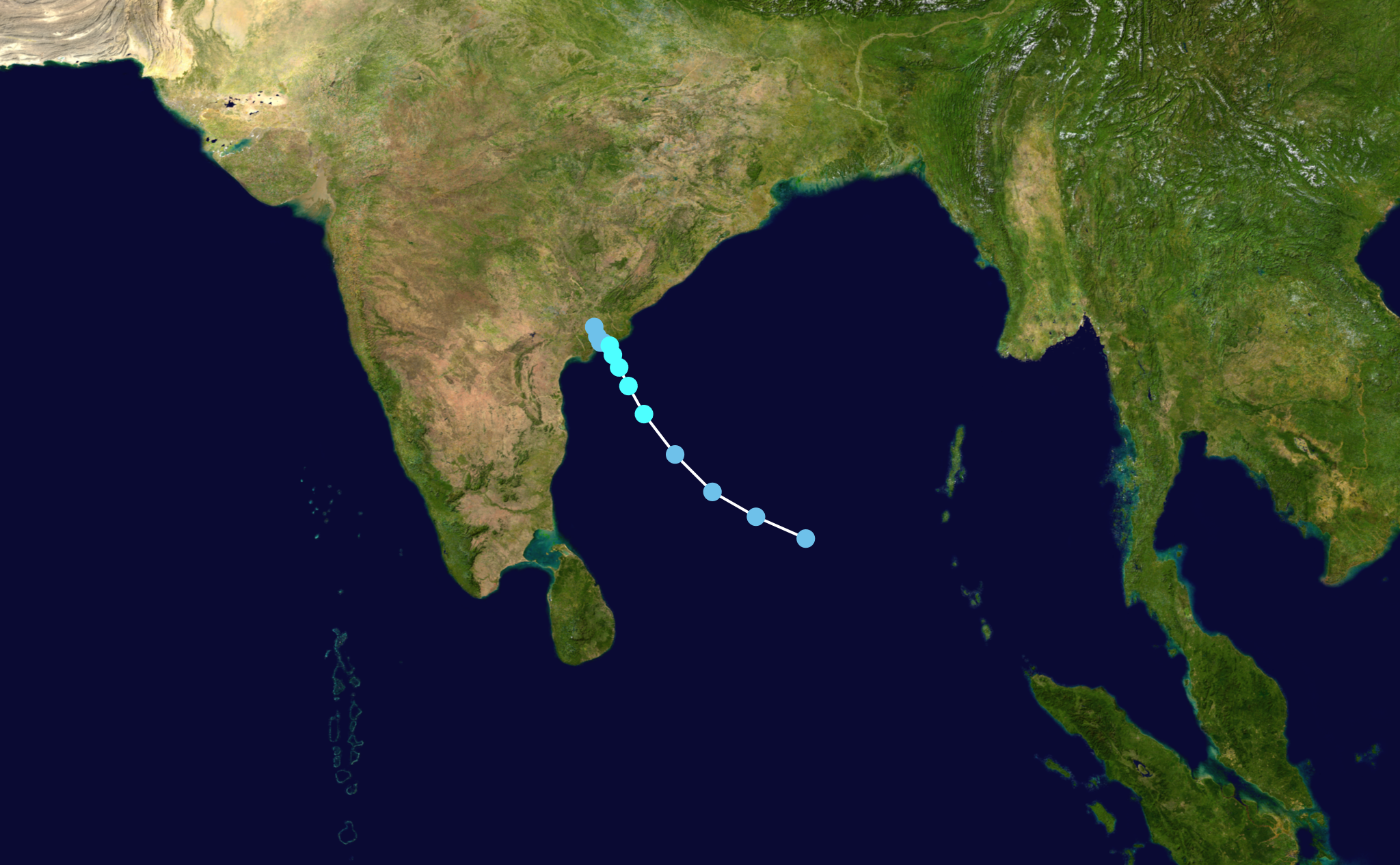
- Duration: October 16 – October 19
- Peak intensity: 75 km/h (45 mph) (3-min); 996 hPa (mbar)

On October 18, a storm equivalent with windspeed of 85 kmph hit the state of Andhra Pradesh, dissipating the next day.

=== Tropical Depression 03A ===
- Depression (IMD)
- Tropical storm (SSHWS)
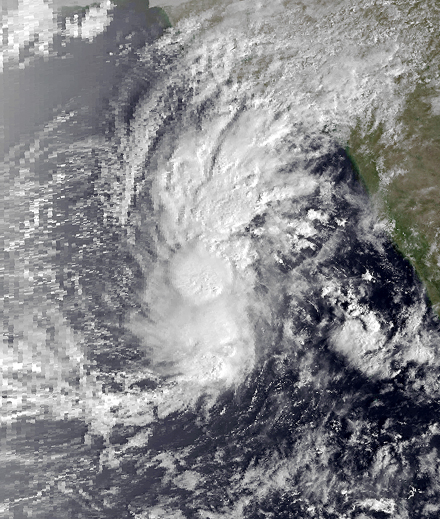
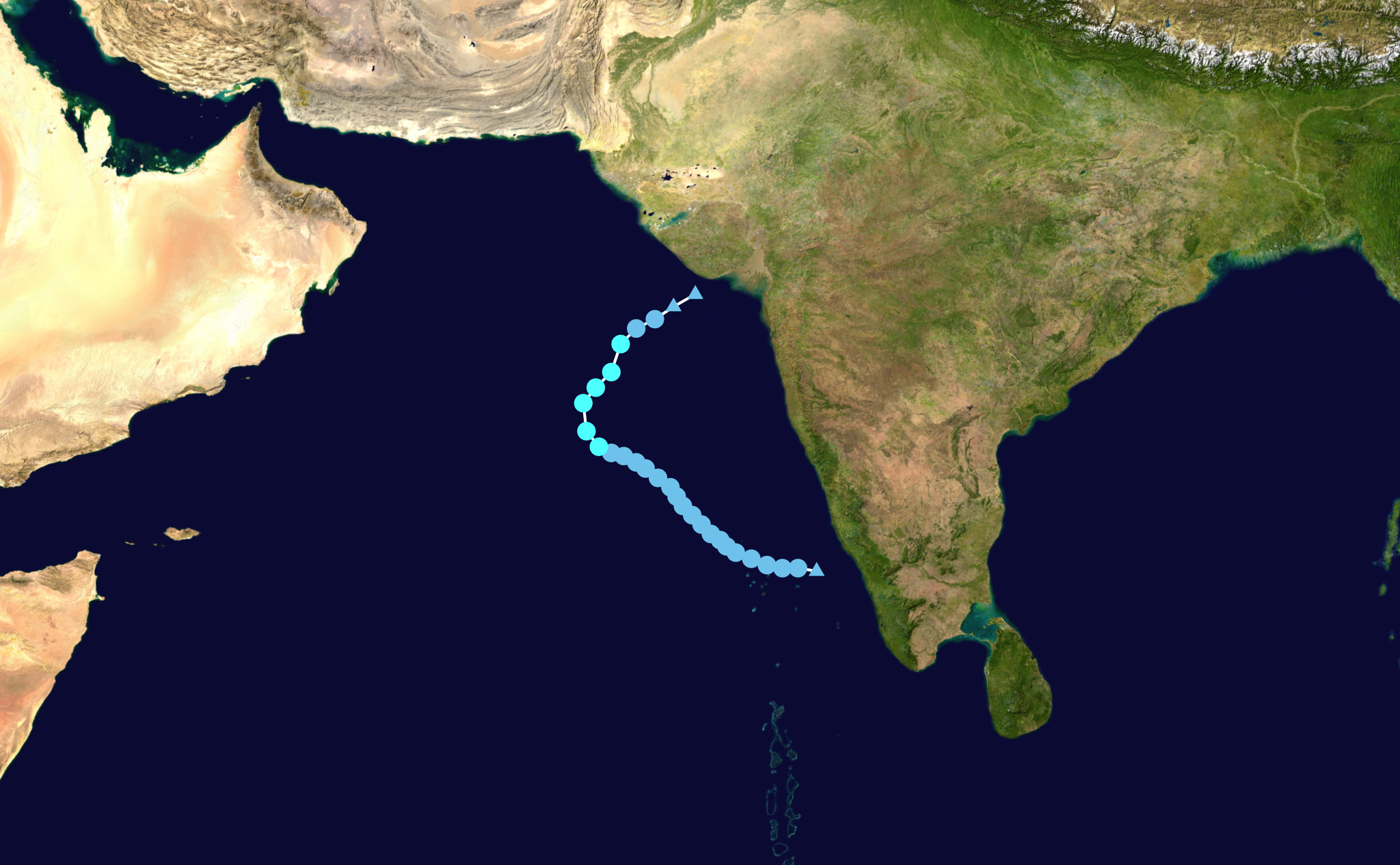
- Duration: November 12 – November 19
- Peak intensity: 45 km/h (30 mph) (3-min);

The monsoon trough spawned a tropical depression off the western Indian coast on November 12. It tracked generally northwestward, slowly organizing into a tropical storm on the 17th. The storm turned to the northeast, where it dissipated over the northeastern Arabian Sea.

=== Cyclonic Storm 04B ===
- Cyclonic storm (IMD)
- Tropical storm (SSHWS)
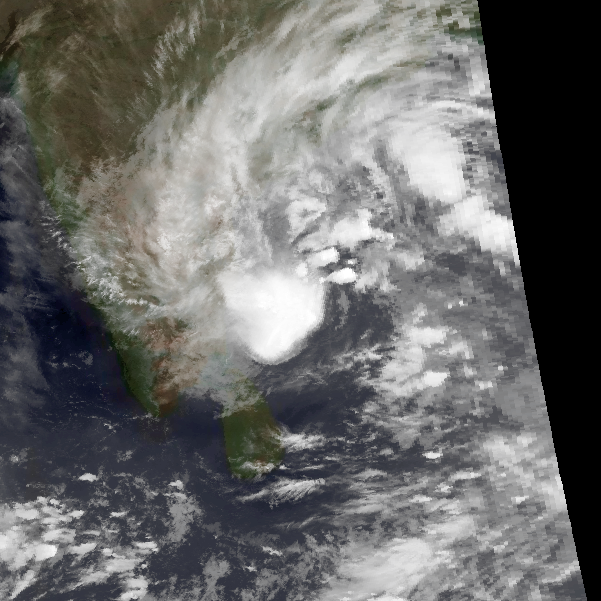
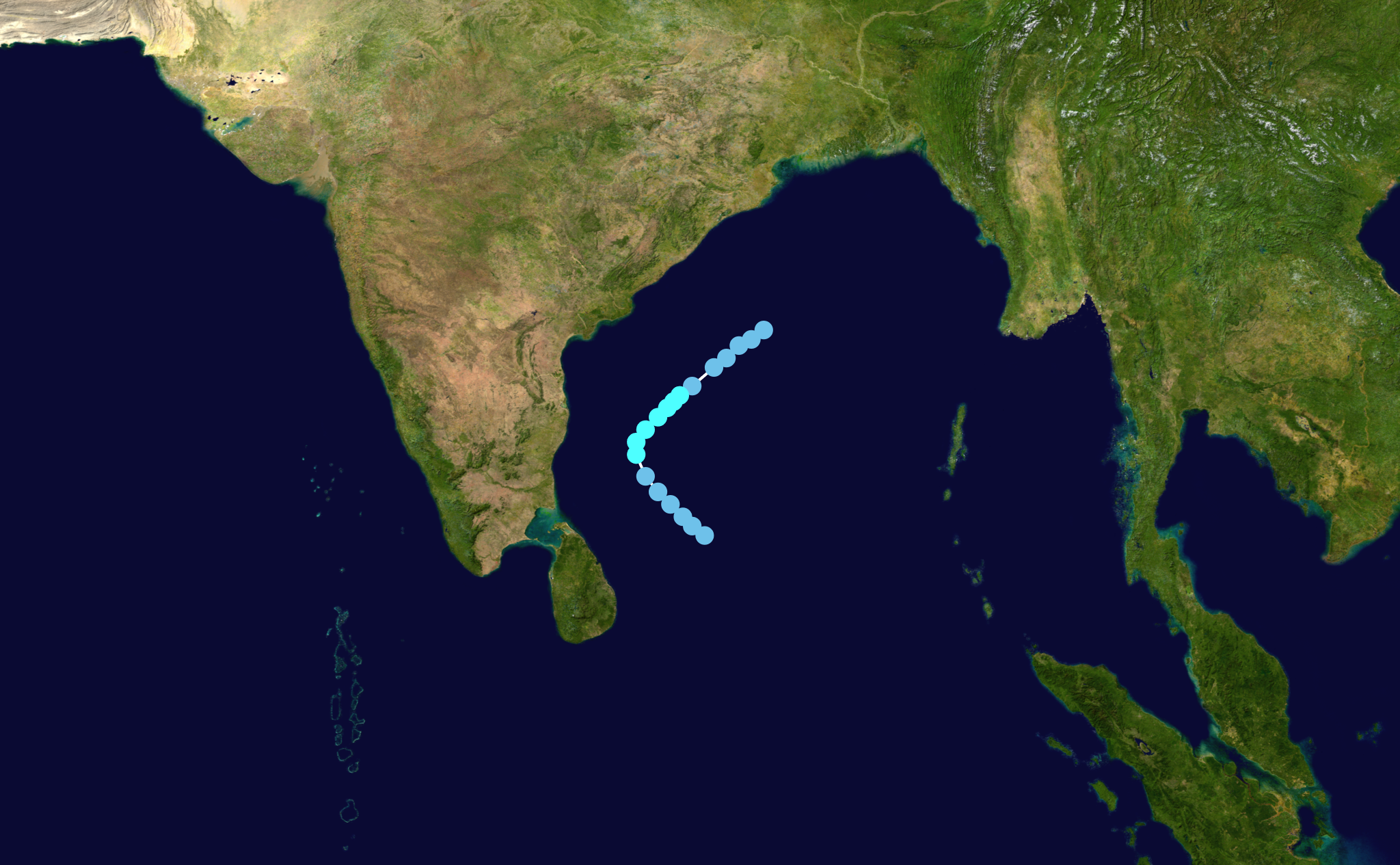
- Duration: December 3 – December 7
- Peak intensity: 75 km/h (45 mph) (3-min); 998 hPa (mbar)

A storm of unknown intensity persisted in the western Bay of Bengal from December 3 to the 7th, remaining well offshore of any landmass.

=== Cyclonic Storm 05B ===
- Cyclonic storm (IMD)
- Tropical storm (SSHWS)
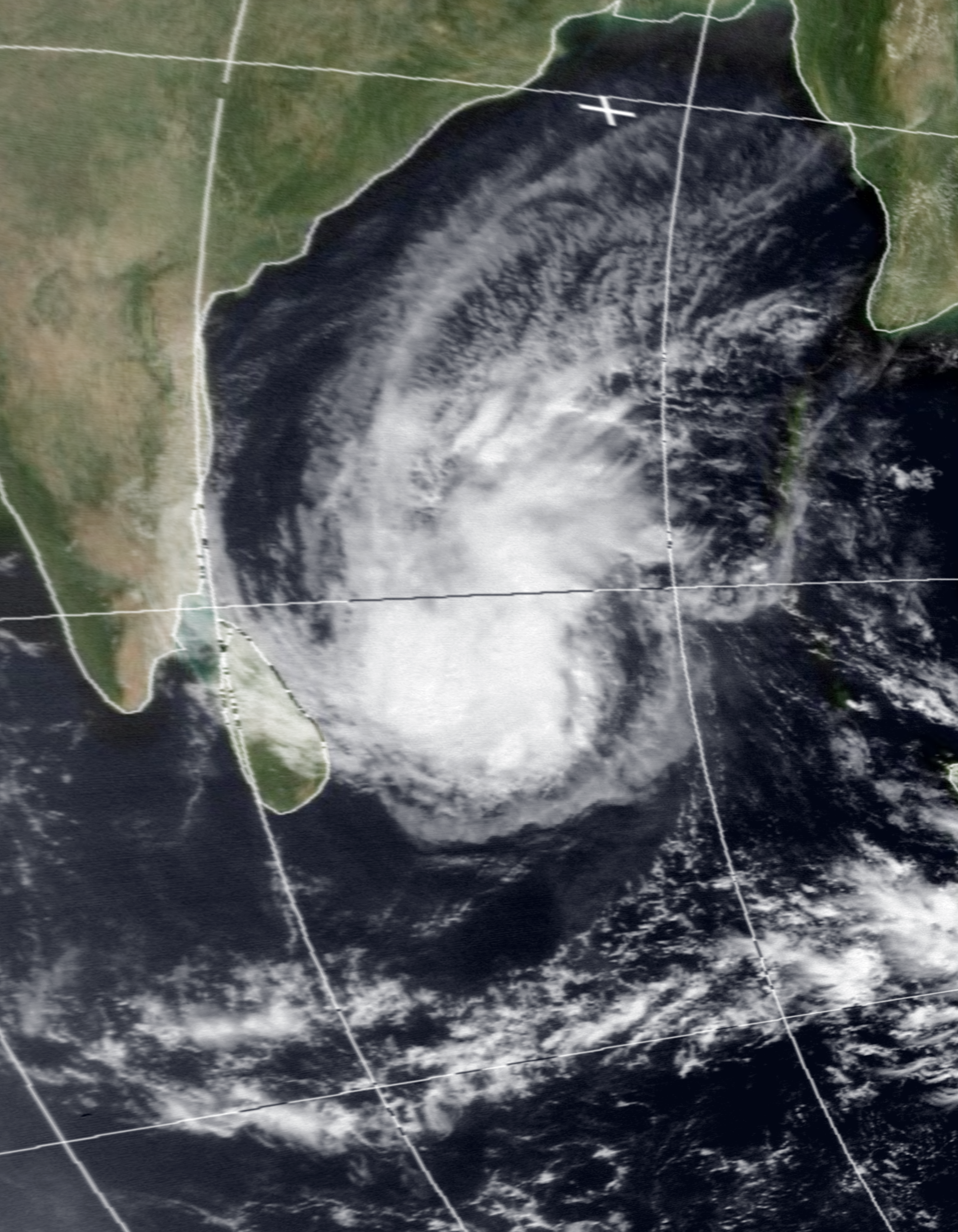
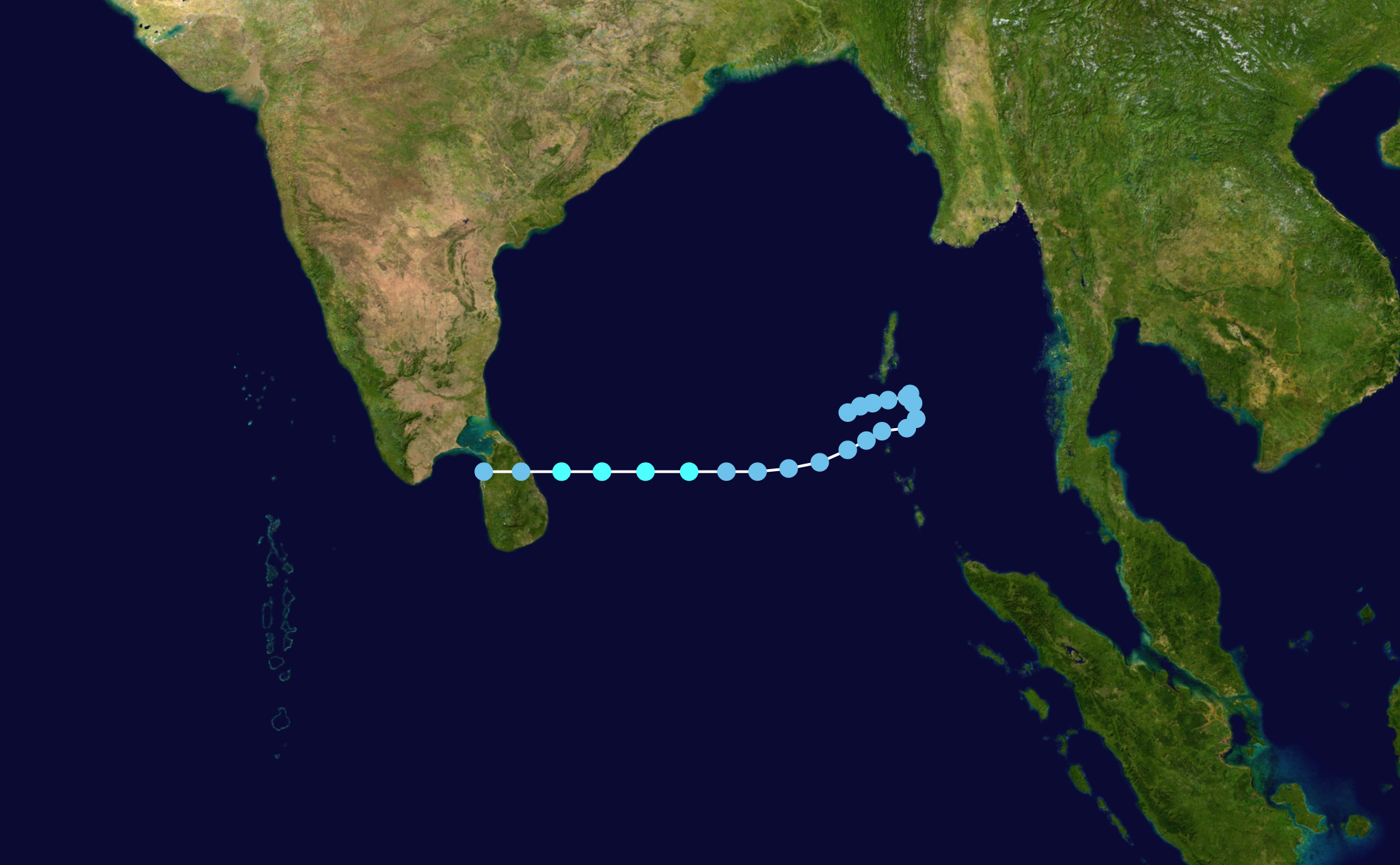
- Duration: December 12 – December 17
- Peak intensity: 75 km/h (45 mph) (3-min); 998 hPa (mbar)

The last storm of the season formed in the central Bay of Bengal on December 12. It moved east-southeastward, then turned to the west where it briefly became a tropical storm. The storm struck eastern Sri Lanka and dissipated over the island on the 17th.

=== Other systems ===
There were 14 depressions during the season. The first depression lasted from May 15–19, moving from the central Bay of Bengal eastward to the Nicobar Islands. The second depression existed from June 4–6 off the west coast of India. On June 21, a land depression developed over central India, moving offshore into the Arabian Sea and dissipating on June 26. There were three land depressions in August, as well as one in September. Another depression developed in the northern Bay of Bengal on September 16 and moved northwestward through India, dissipating on September 26. Another depression developed in the Bay of Bengal on October 1, striking Bangladesh three days later. On October 14, a depression developed in the central Arabian Sea and moved westward, passing near Socotra on October 17; it moved into the Gulf of Aden a day later.

== See also ==
- North Indian Ocean tropical cyclone
- 1980 Atlantic hurricane season
- 1980 Pacific hurricane season
- 1980 Pacific typhoon season
- Australian cyclone seasons: 1979–80, 1980–81
- South Pacific cyclone seasons: 1979–80, 1980–81
- South-West Indian Ocean cyclone seasons: 1979–80, 1980–81
