= 1980 Pacific hurricane season =

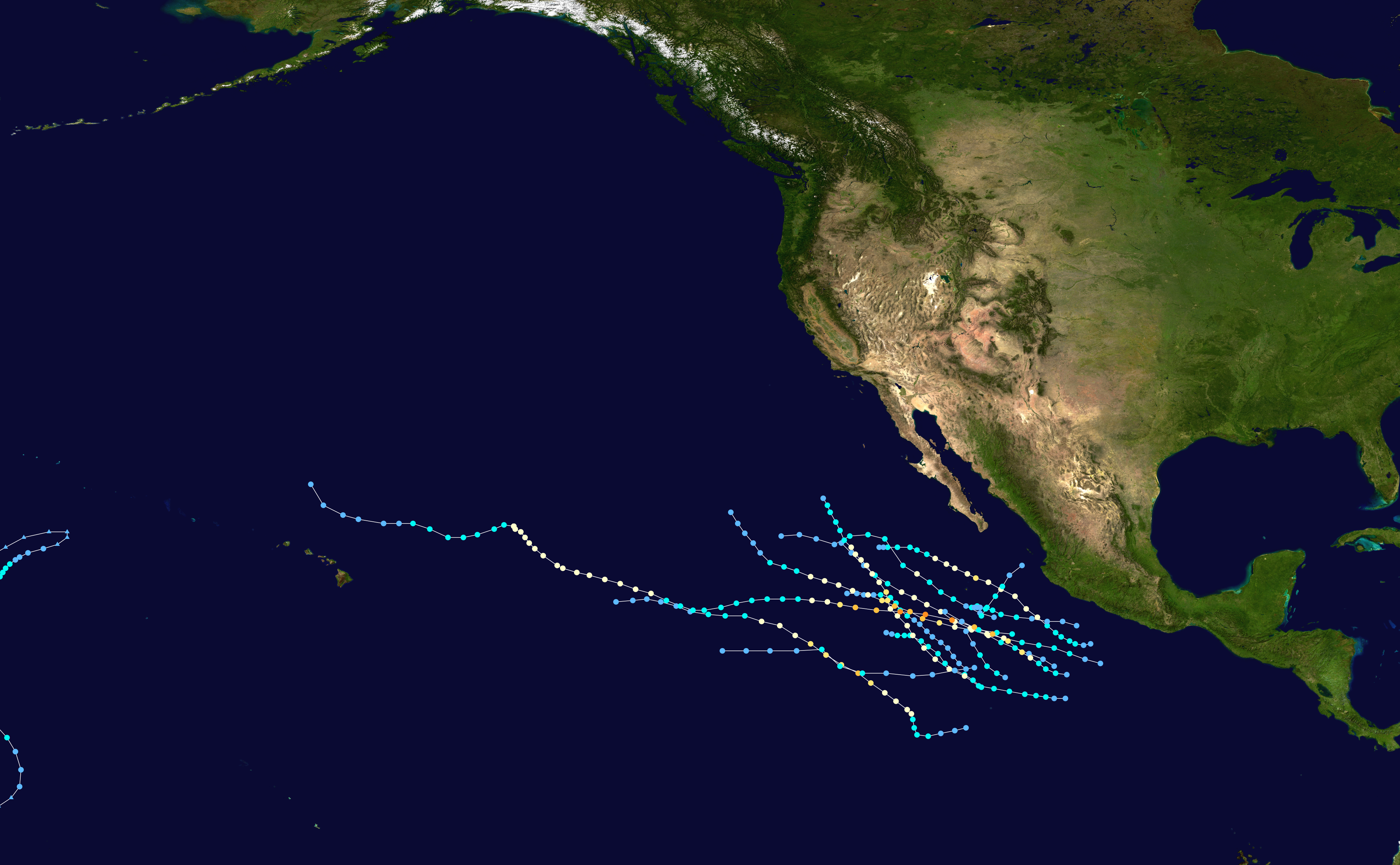
- Season summary map

Seasonal boundaries
- First system formed: April 4, 1980
- Last system dissipated: October 29, 1980

Strongest storm
- Name: Kay
  - Maximum winds: 140 mph (220 km/h) (1-minute sustained)

Seasonal statistics
- Total depressions: 16
- Total storms: 15
- Hurricanes: 7
- Major hurricanes (Cat. 3+): 3
- Total fatalities: 0
- Total damage: None

Related articles
- 1980 Atlantic hurricane season; 1980 Pacific typhoon season; 1980 North Indian Ocean cyclone season

The 1980 Pacific hurricane season officially started May 15, 1980, in the eastern Pacific and June 1, 1980, in the central Pacific, lasting until November 30, 1980. These dates conventionally delimit each year when most tropical cyclones form in the northeastern and central Pacific Ocean. This season was relatively uneventful; since no tropical cyclones made landfall, there were no reports of casualties or damage.

Overall, the 1980 season was slightly below the long-term average, with 16 tropical cyclones forming. Of those, 15 were named, 7 reached hurricane intensity, and only 3 became major hurricanes by attaining category 3 status or higher on the Saffir–Simpson scale. All eastern Pacific systems this year formed in the eastern Pacific proper and two storms crossed into the central Pacific: Carmen from the west and Kay from the east. The season had an early start when Carmen crossed over the International Date Line in April. The strongest storm of this season is Hurricane Kay, peaking at 140 mph (225 km/h). Kay lasted for fourteen and a half days, which was the fifth-longest-lasting Pacific hurricane at the time.

== Season summary ==
The 1980 Pacific hurricane season began on April 5, 1980, with the crossing of the International Date Line by Tropical Storm Carmen and ended with the dissipation of Tropical Depression Newton on October 29. Of the sixteen tropical cyclones that in the eastern north Pacific Ocean during 1980, one was a tropical depression, eight were tropical storms, and seven were hurricanes, of which three were major hurricanes of Category or higher on the Saffir–Simpson scale. Of these systems, all except one tropical storm formed east of 140°W in the eastern Pacific proper. These totals are below the long-term average of fifteen tropical storms, nine hurricanes, and four major hurricanes. Two tropical cyclones existed in the central Pacific, both of which crossed in from other tropical cyclone basins. This total is below the average of four or five tropical cyclones per year.

== Systems ==
=== Tropical Storm Carmen ===
- Tropical storm (SSHWS)
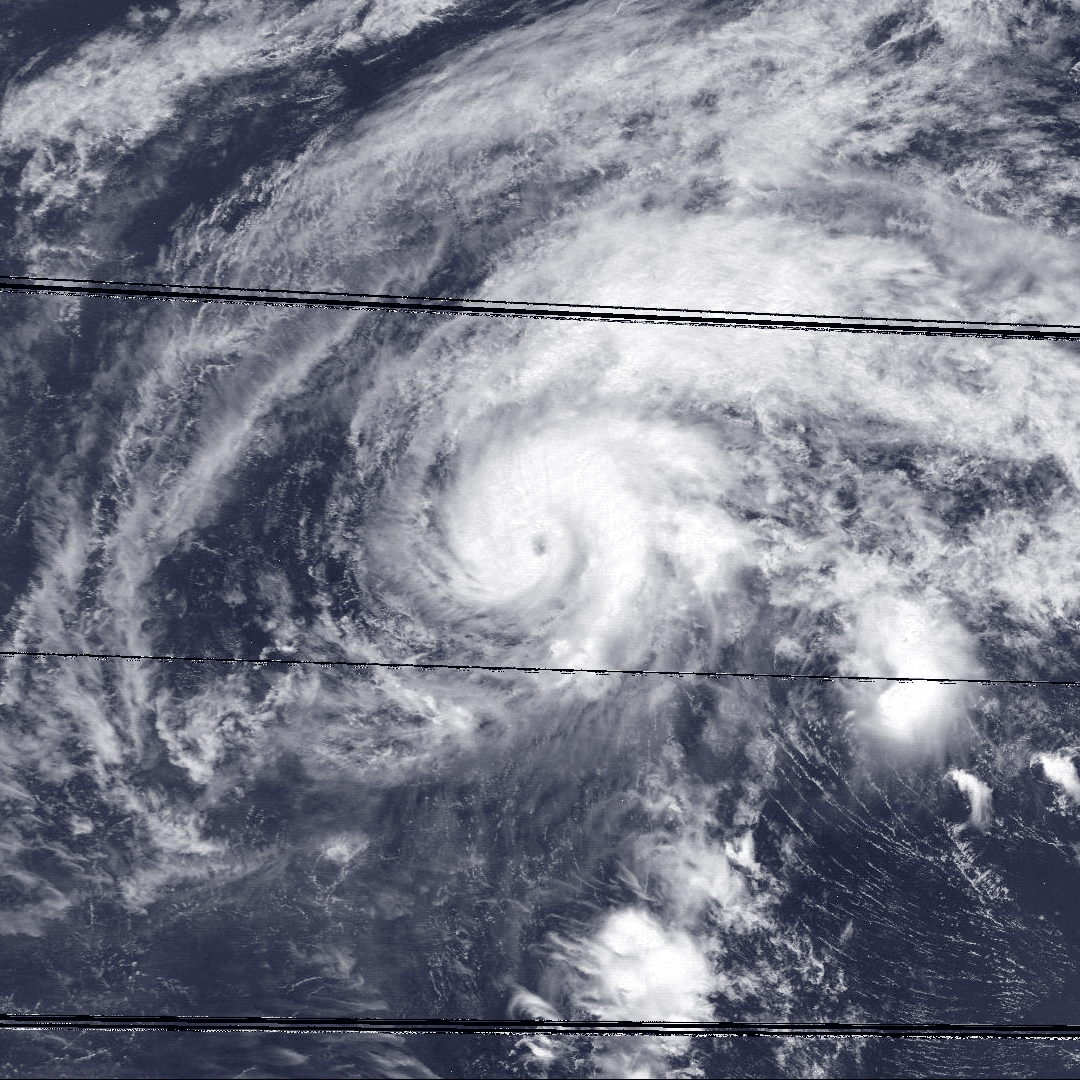
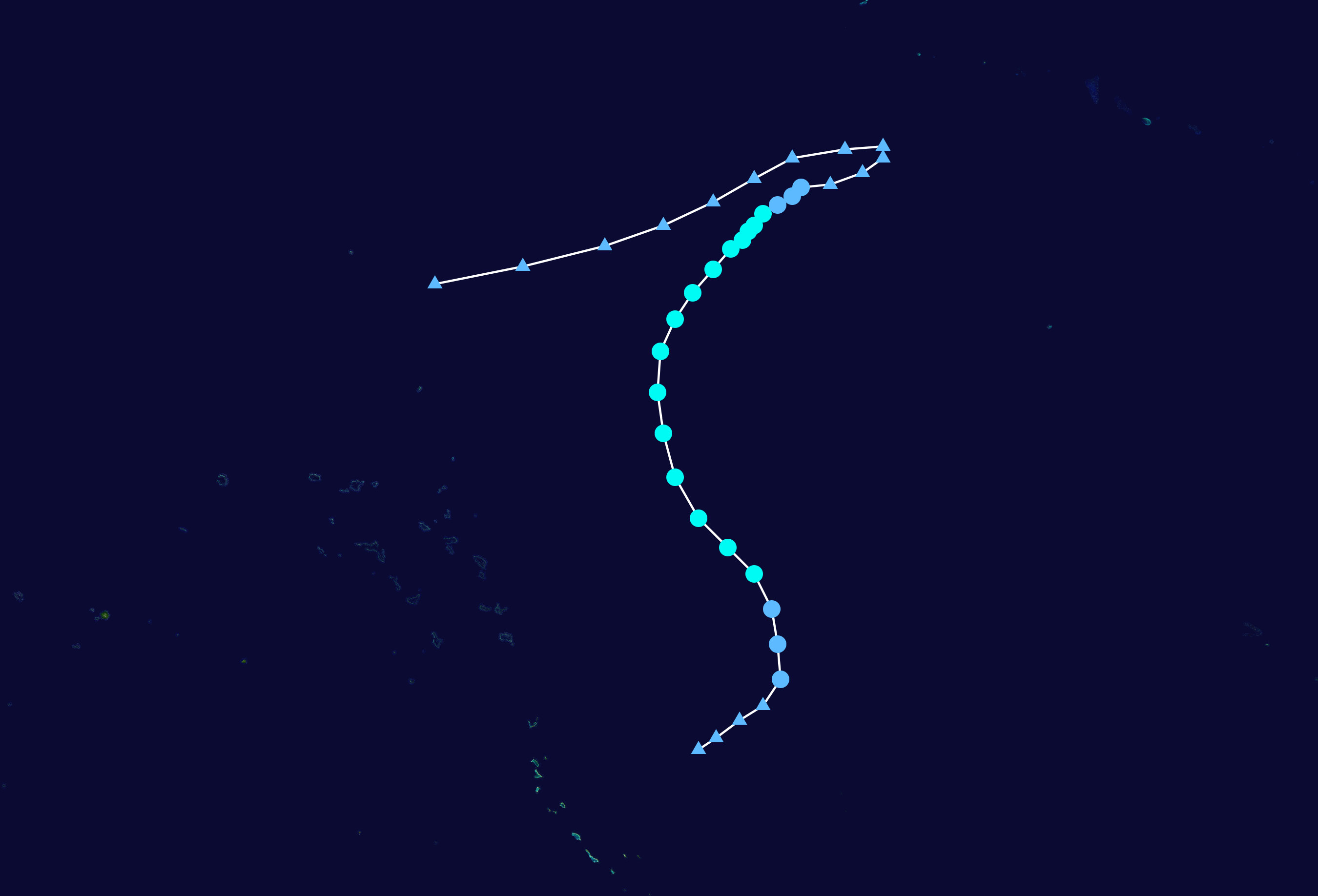
- Duration: April 4 – April 8 (Out of basin between April 5-April 7)
- Peak intensity: 50 mph (85 km/h) (1-min);

On April 5, a tropical depression formed at the western edge of the central Pacific basin and exited the central Pacific basin and strengthened to a tropical storm while the western Pacific basin. Carmen then re-entered the central Pacific basin on April 7 while weakening. The storm weakened to a remnant low on April 8.

=== Hurricane Agatha ===
- Category 3 hurricane (SSHWS)
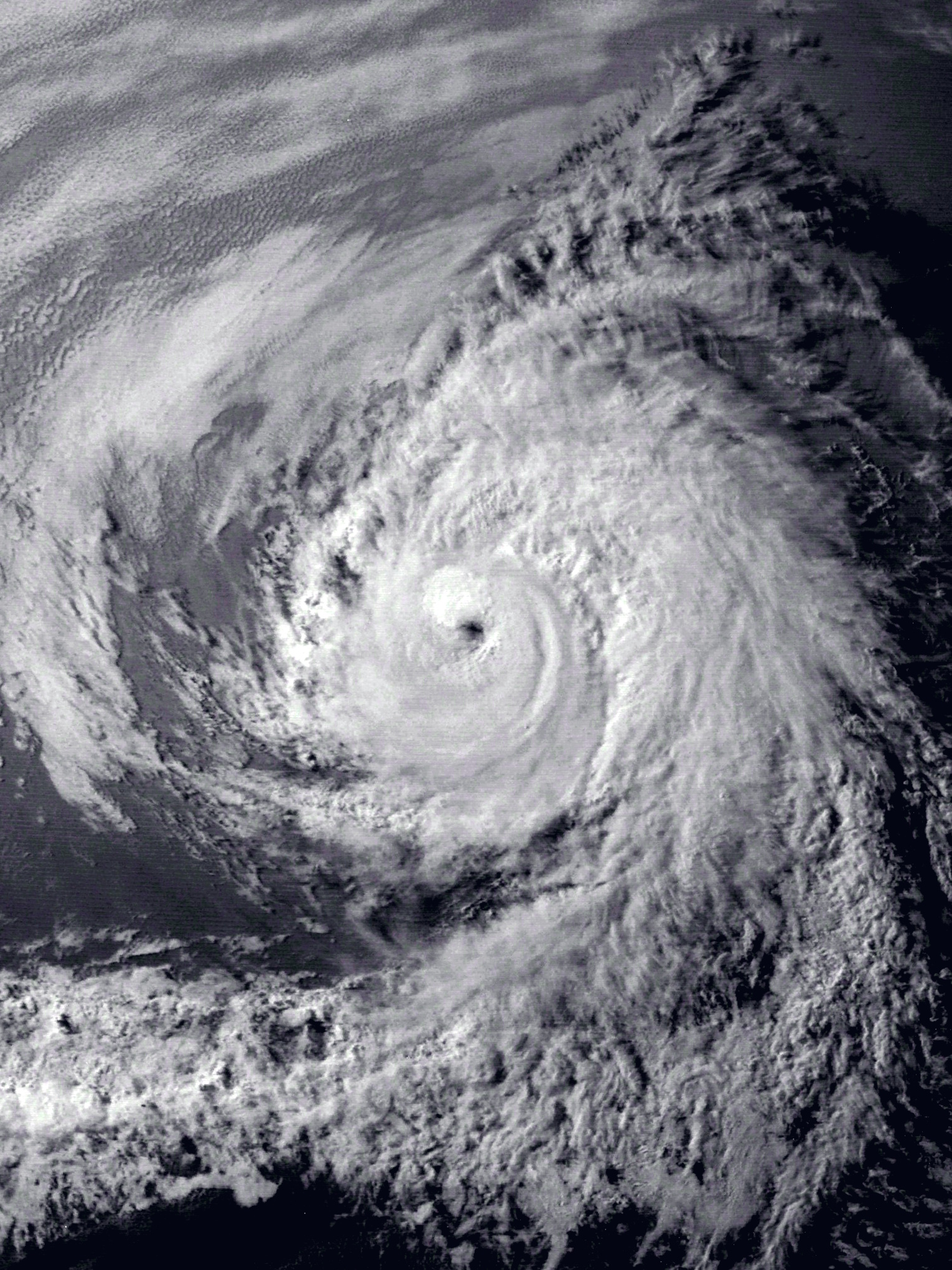
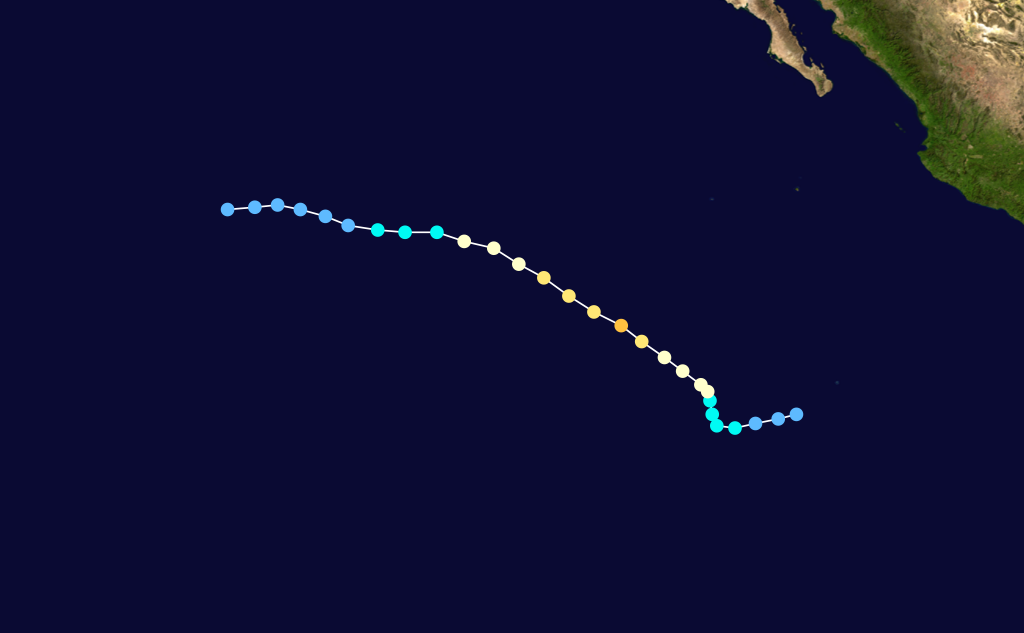
- Duration: June 9 – June 15
- Peak intensity: 115 mph (185 km/h) (1-min);

Agatha originated from a tropical depression that formed 400 mi (640 km) south-southwest of Acapulco on June 9. After becoming better organized, EPHC upgraded the depression into a tropical storm later that day, giving it the name Agatha. The storm turned north then northwest and strengthened into a hurricane. On June 12, Agatha reached its peak intensity with maximum sustained winds of 115 mph (185 km/h), a category 3 hurricane on the Saffir–Simpson hurricane wind scale. After entering an area with cooler sea surface temperature and stable air, Agatha steadily weakened into a tropical storm on June 13 and a tropical depression on June 14. The EPHC issued the last advisory on Agatha on the following day as Agatha rapidly dissipated.

=== Tropical Storm Blas ===
- Tropical storm (SSHWS)
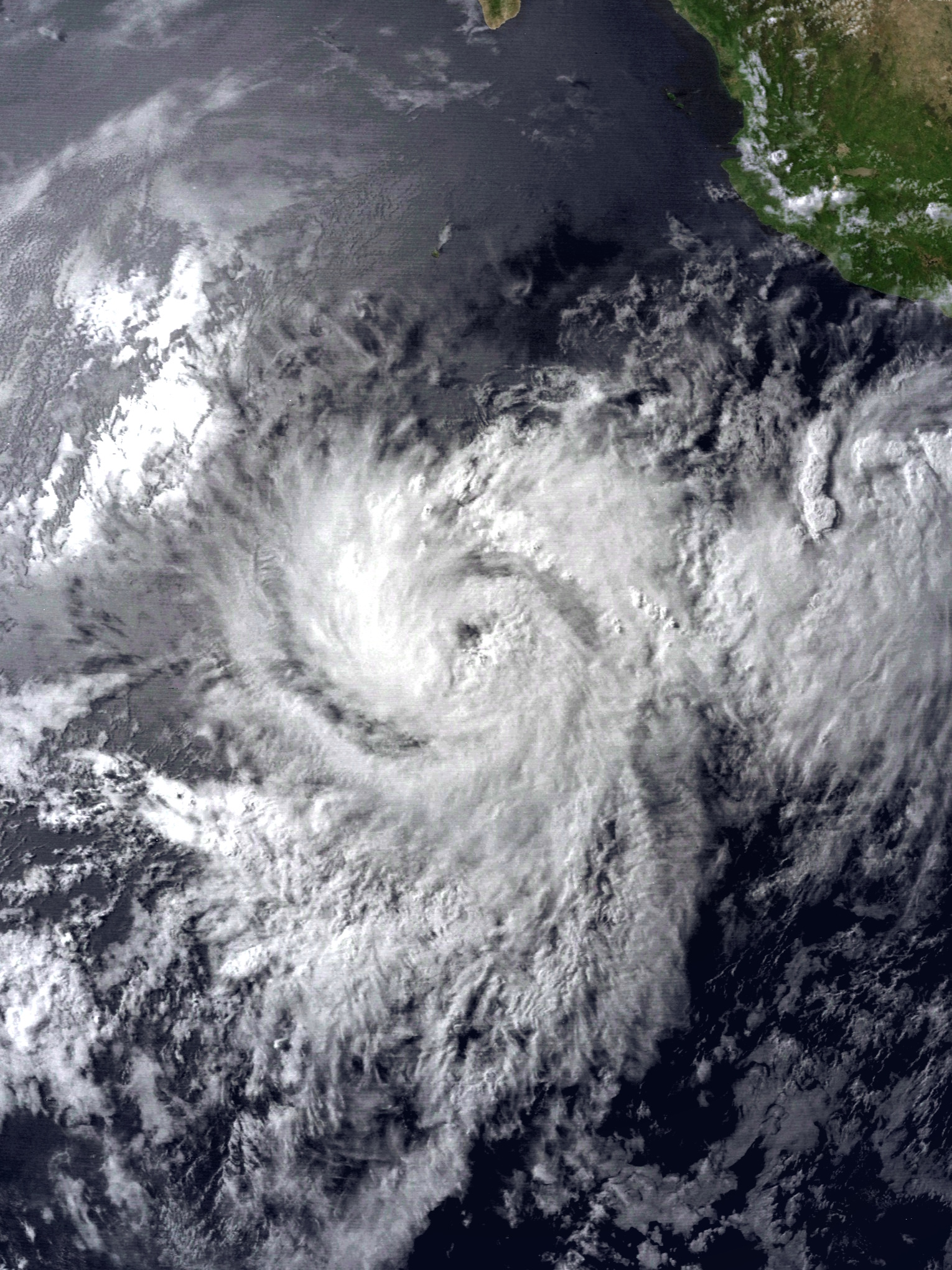
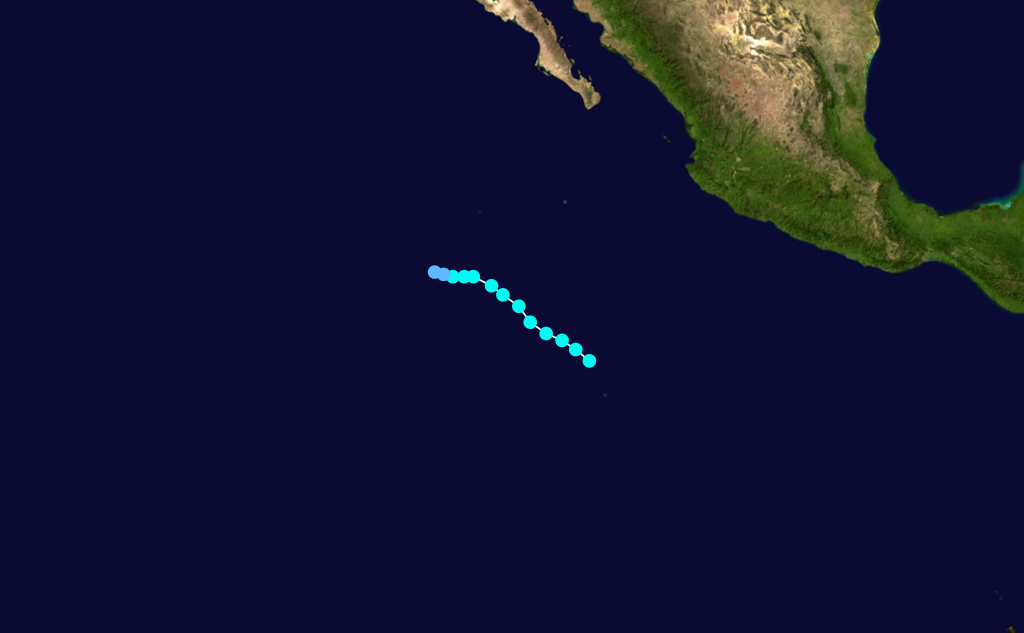
- Duration: June 16 – June 19
- Peak intensity: 60 mph (95 km/h) (1-min);

A disturbance south-southwest of Acapulco developed a circulation and was designated Tropical Storm Blas on June 16. It headed northwest, and intensified, peaking in windspeed that same day. The cyclone then steadily weakened and dissipated on June 19, twelve hours after weakening into a tropical depression.

=== Tropical Depression Three-E ===
- Tropical depression (SSHWS)
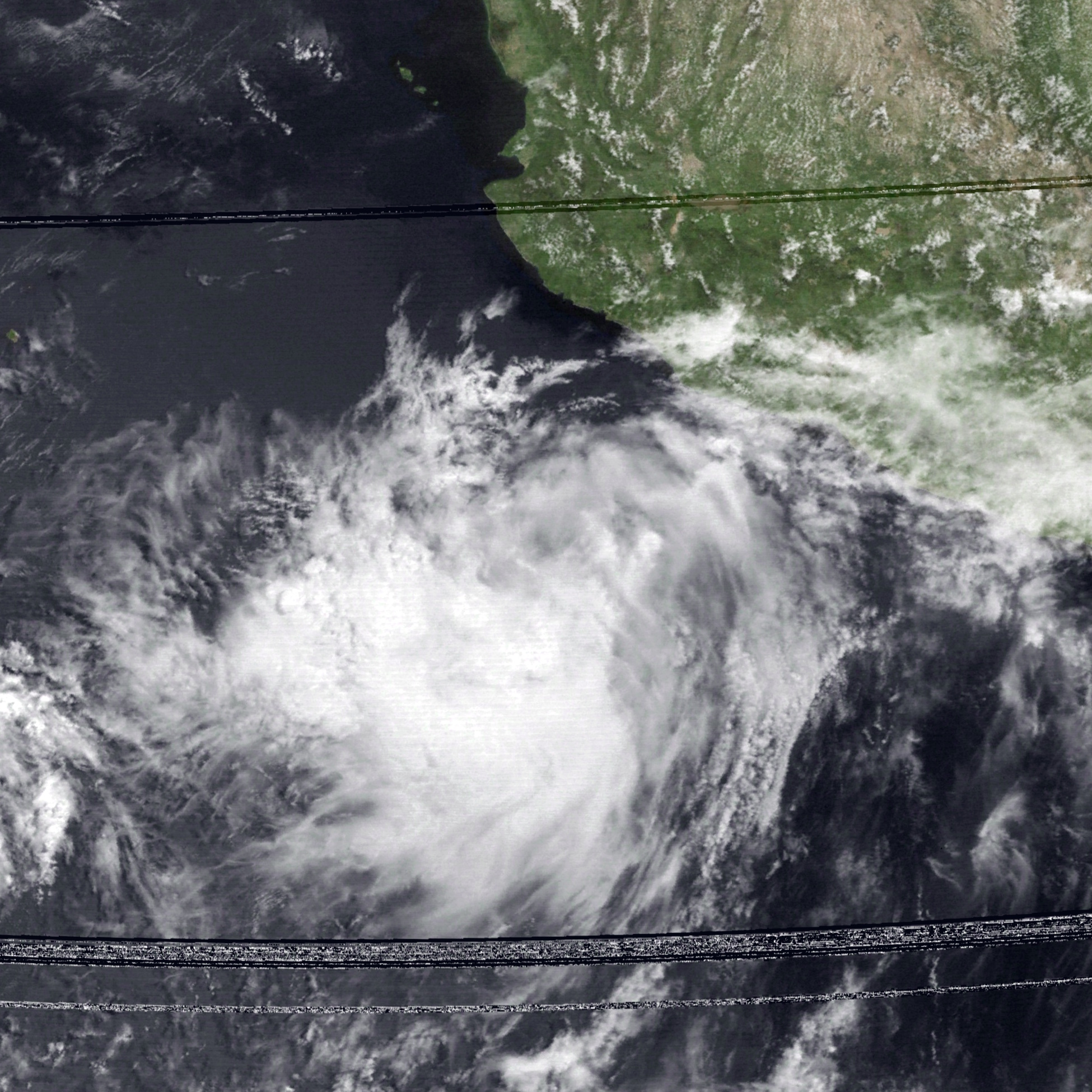
- Duration: June 17 – June 19
- Peak intensity: 35 mph (55 km/h) (1-min);

A disturbance south of Acapulco developed into a tropical depression on June 17. It moved northwest and then west, and never strengthened much. The tropical cyclone dissipated on June 19 after moving over cooler waters.

=== Hurricane Celia ===
- Category 1 hurricane (SSHWS)
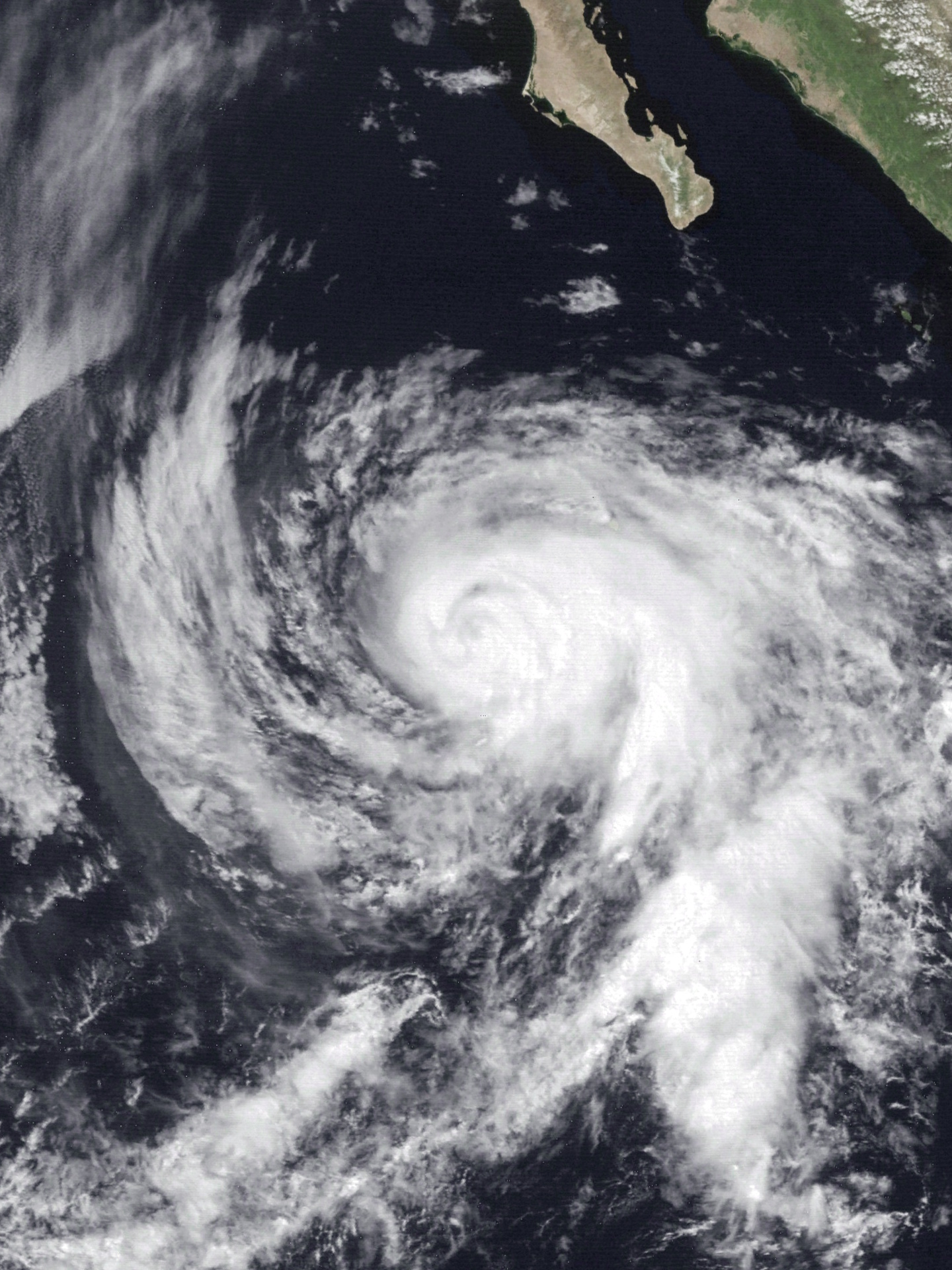
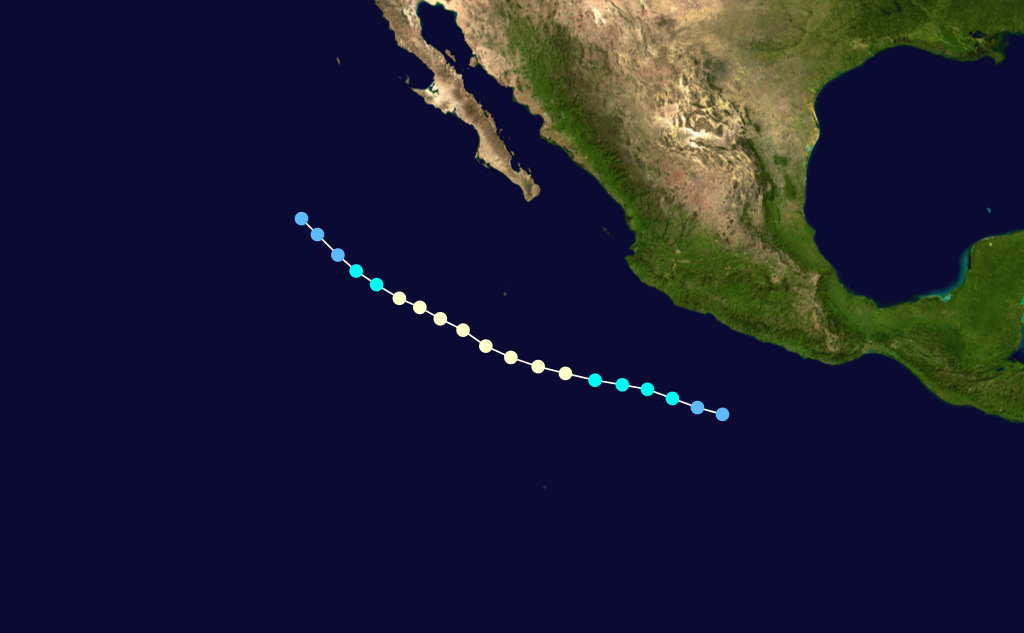
- Duration: June 25 – June 29
- Peak intensity: 75 mph (120 km/h) (1-min);

A tropical disturbance moving west-northwestward organized into a tropical depression on June 25. It quickly strengthened to Tropical Storm Celia. Celia intensified into a hurricane on June 26 and reached its peak intensity from June 26 to June 28. Celia then curved to the northwest as it wheeled around the edge of a ridge. Celia weakened into a tropical storm on June 28, a depression on June 29, and dissipated just after that. It remnants persisted, and cloudiness and moisture associated with the cyclone were carried into the Continental United States by an upper-level trough.

Celia's remnants and moisture brought rain to Santa Barbara County, California, on the last two days of June. Other than that, Celia caused no impact.

=== Tropical Storm Darby ===
- Tropical storm (SSHWS)
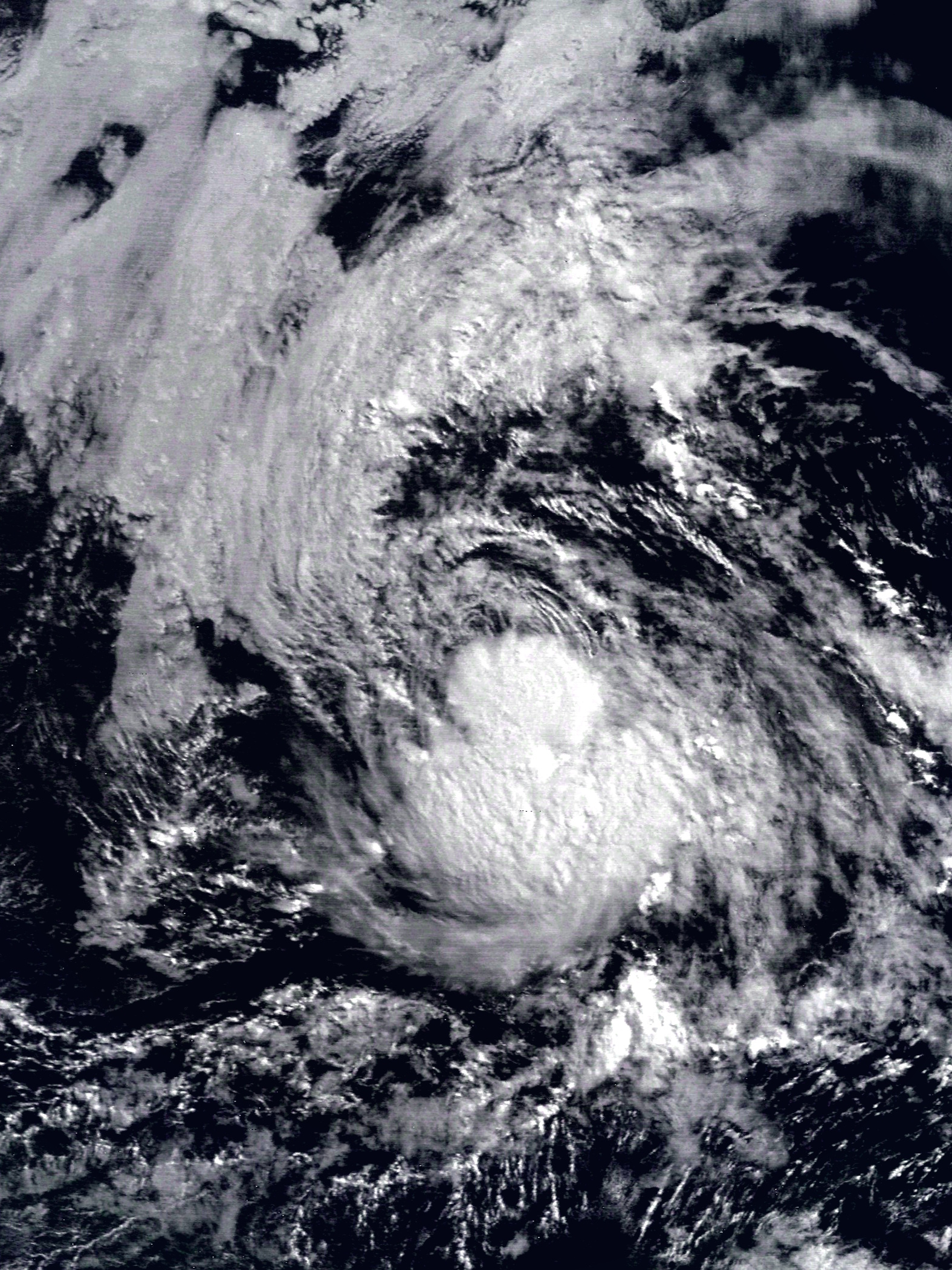
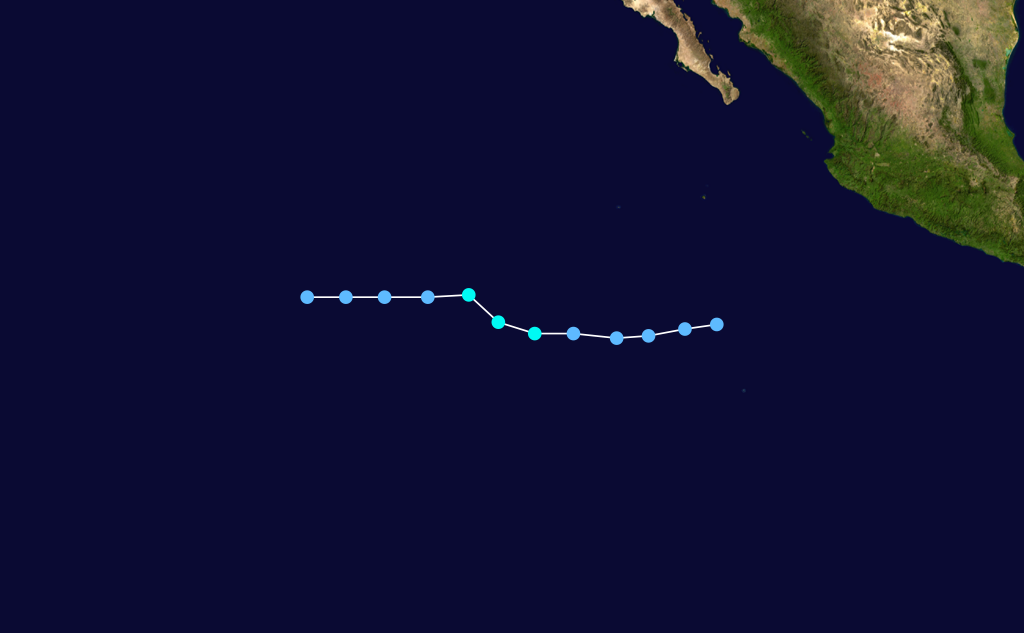
- Duration: July 1 – July 3
- Peak intensity: 50 mph (85 km/h) (1-min);

On July 1, a westward-moving tropical disturbance located to the southwest of Acapulco organized into a tropical depression. The next day, it intensified into a tropical storm as it briefly jogged to the north. Darby peaked in wind speed just after that. It then weakened into a depression on July 3 and dissipated later that day.

=== Tropical Storm Estelle ===
- Tropical storm (SSHWS)
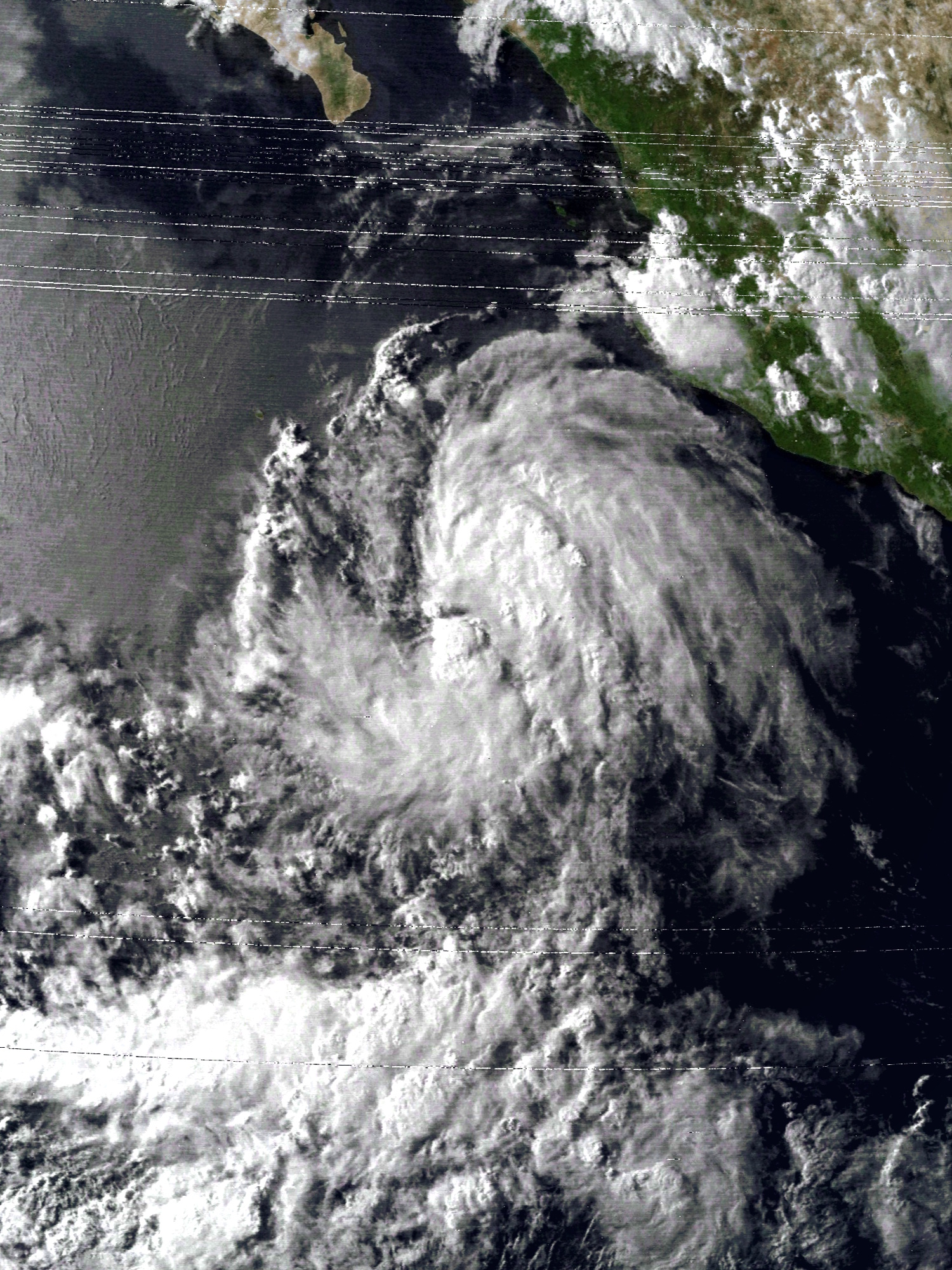
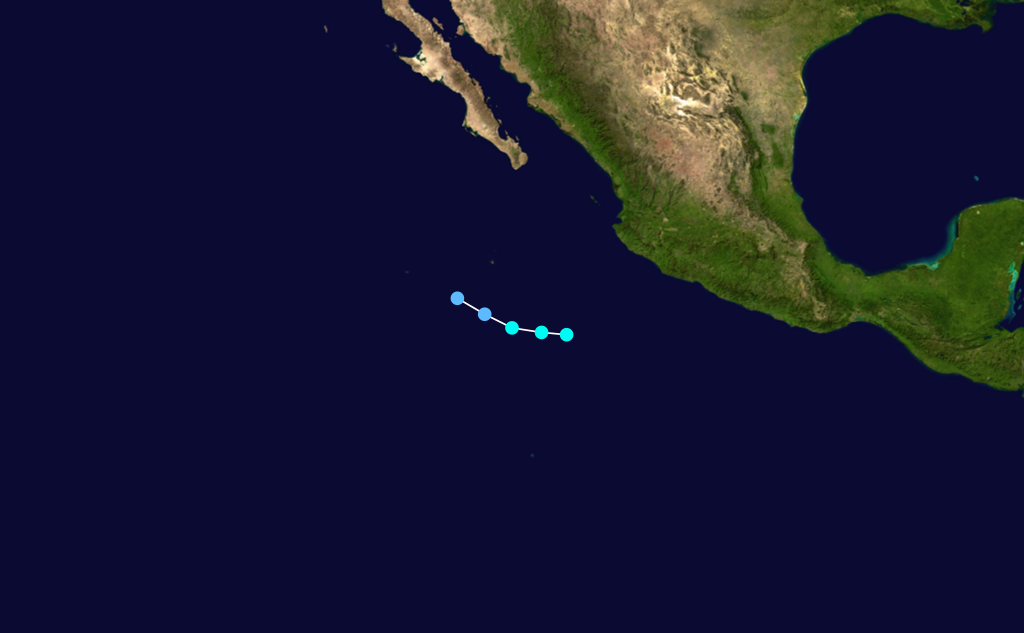
- Duration: July 12 – July 13
- Peak intensity: 45 mph (75 km/h) (1-min);

An area of disturbed weather developed gale-force winds and a cyclonic circulation and was upgraded directly to tropical storm status on July 12. Estelle's winds peaked in velocity just after that. The cyclone then steadily weakened as it curved to the west-northwest. Estelle dissipated on July 13. Estelle did not affect land. No damage or casualties were attributed to this tropical cyclone.

=== Tropical Storm Frank ===
- Tropical storm (SSHWS)
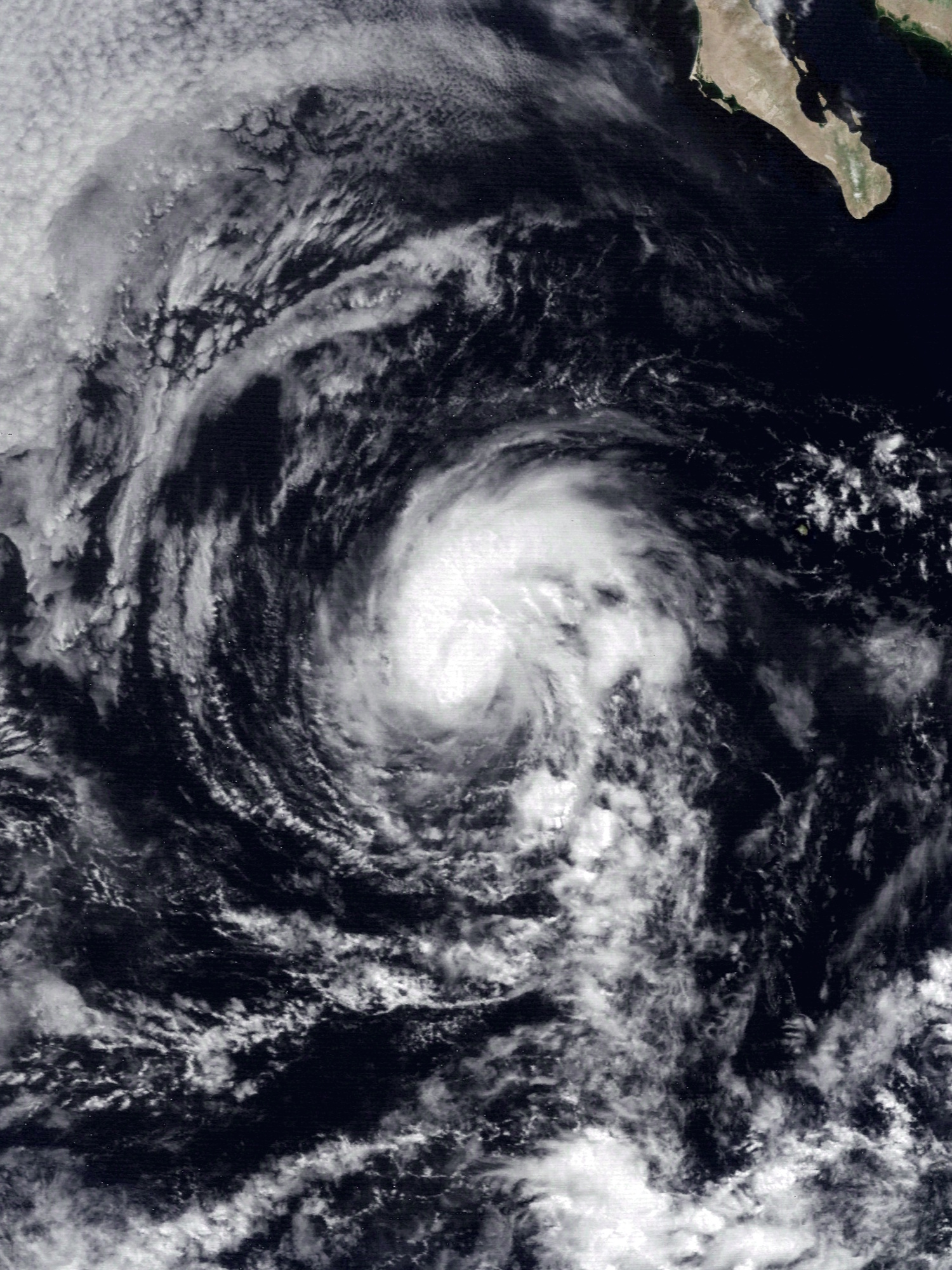
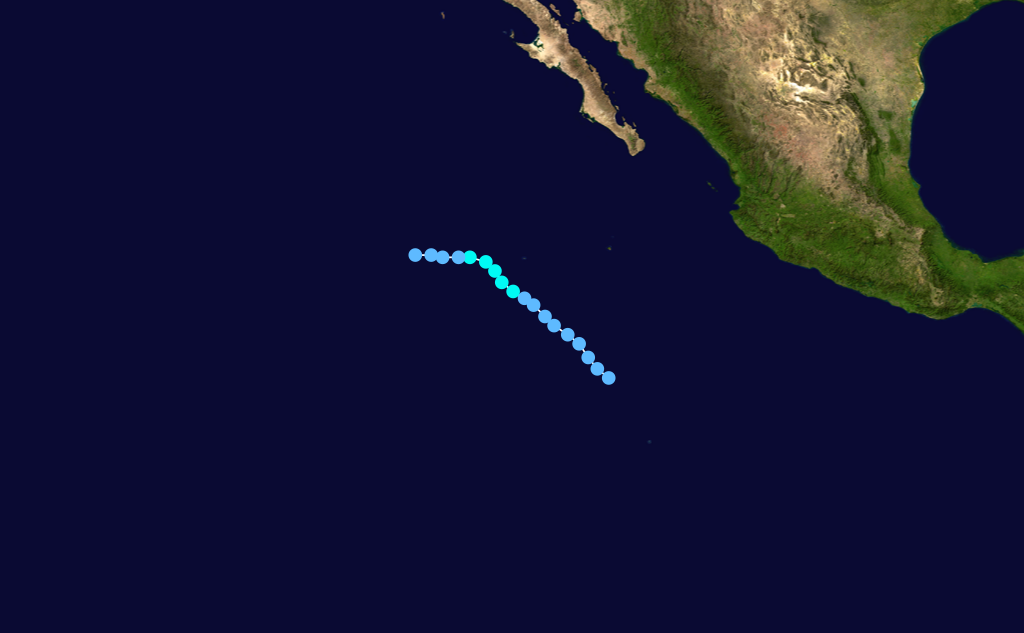
- Duration: July 18 – July 22
- Peak intensity: 50 mph (85 km/h) (1-min);

A tropical disturbance northeast of Clipperton organized into a tropical depression on July 18. Heading northwestwards, it intensified into a tropical storm on July 20. Frank reached its maximum wind speed shortly after that. The cyclone then turned to the west and gradually weakened, dissipating on July 22.

=== Hurricane Georgette ===
- Category 1 hurricane (SSHWS)
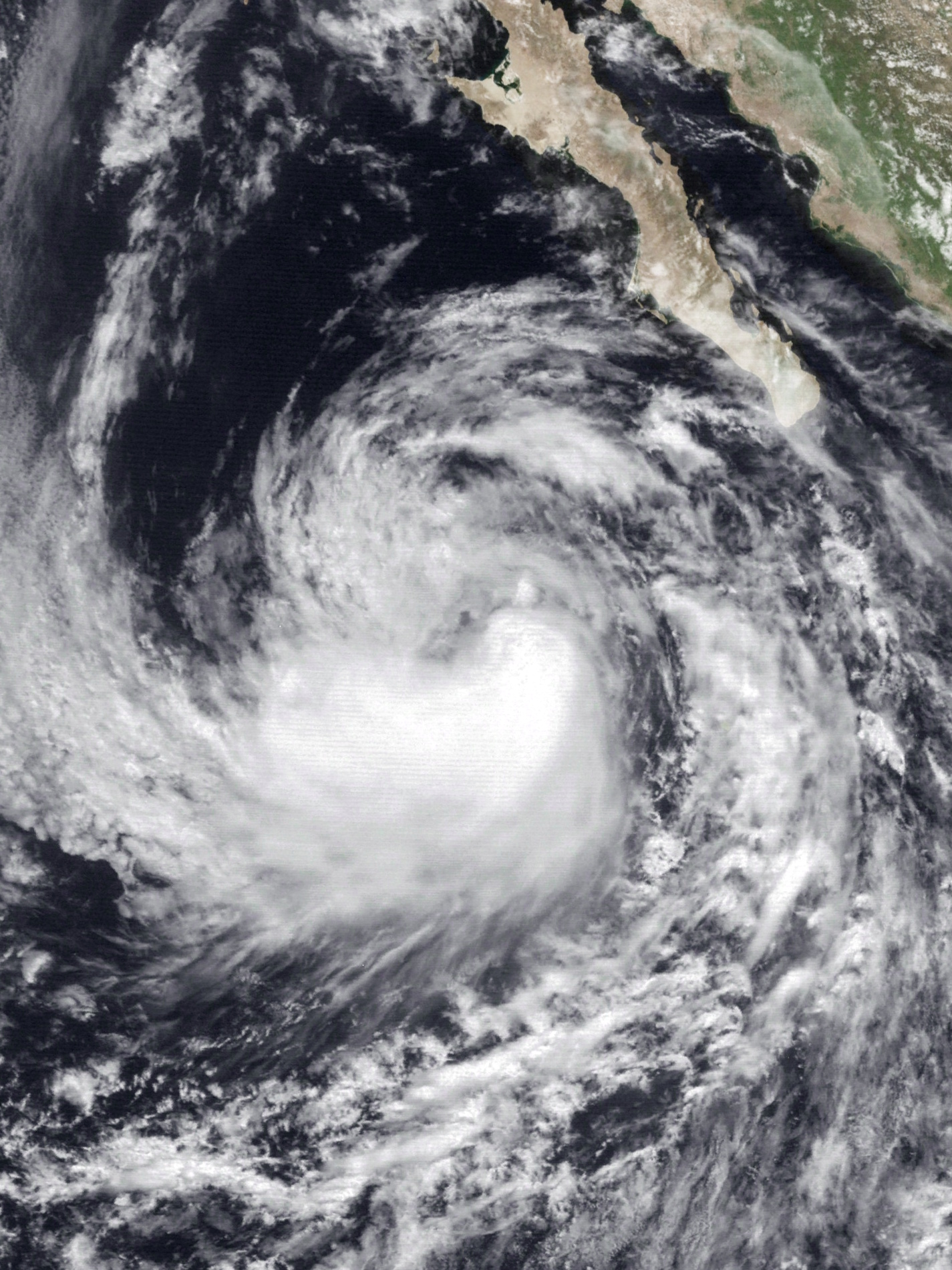
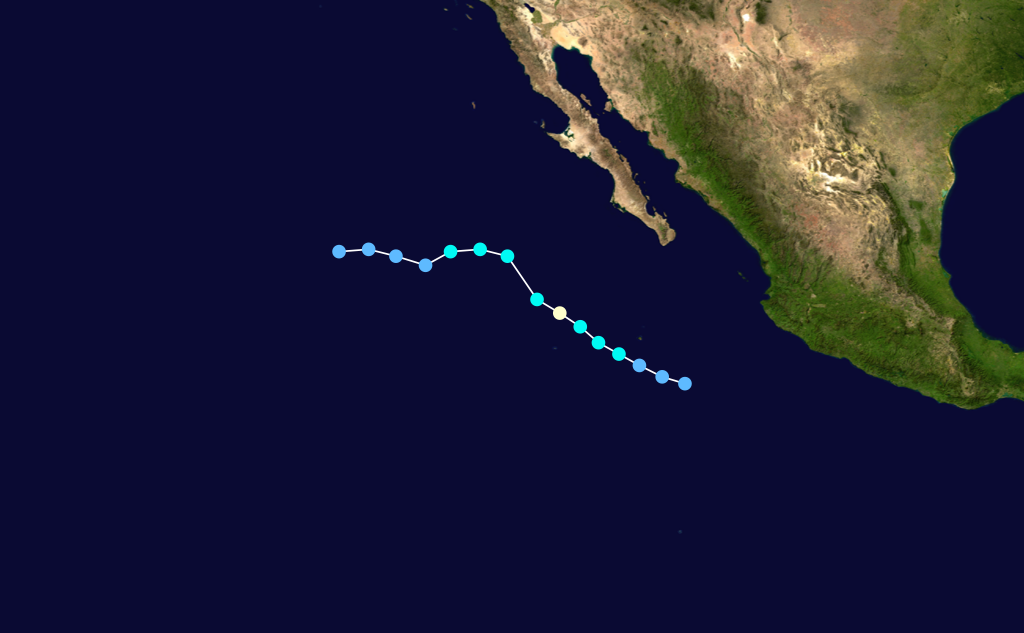
- Duration: July 28 – July 31
- Peak intensity: 75 mph (120 km/h) (1-min);

A tropical disturbance formed southwest of Acapulco on July 26. The disturbance was then upgraded to a tropical depression on July 28. The cyclone headed northwest. It intensified into a tropical storm on July 29, peaking as a hurricane that same day. The cyclone turned to the west and weakened, dissipating on July 31.

=== Hurricane Howard ===
- Category 2 hurricane (SSHWS)
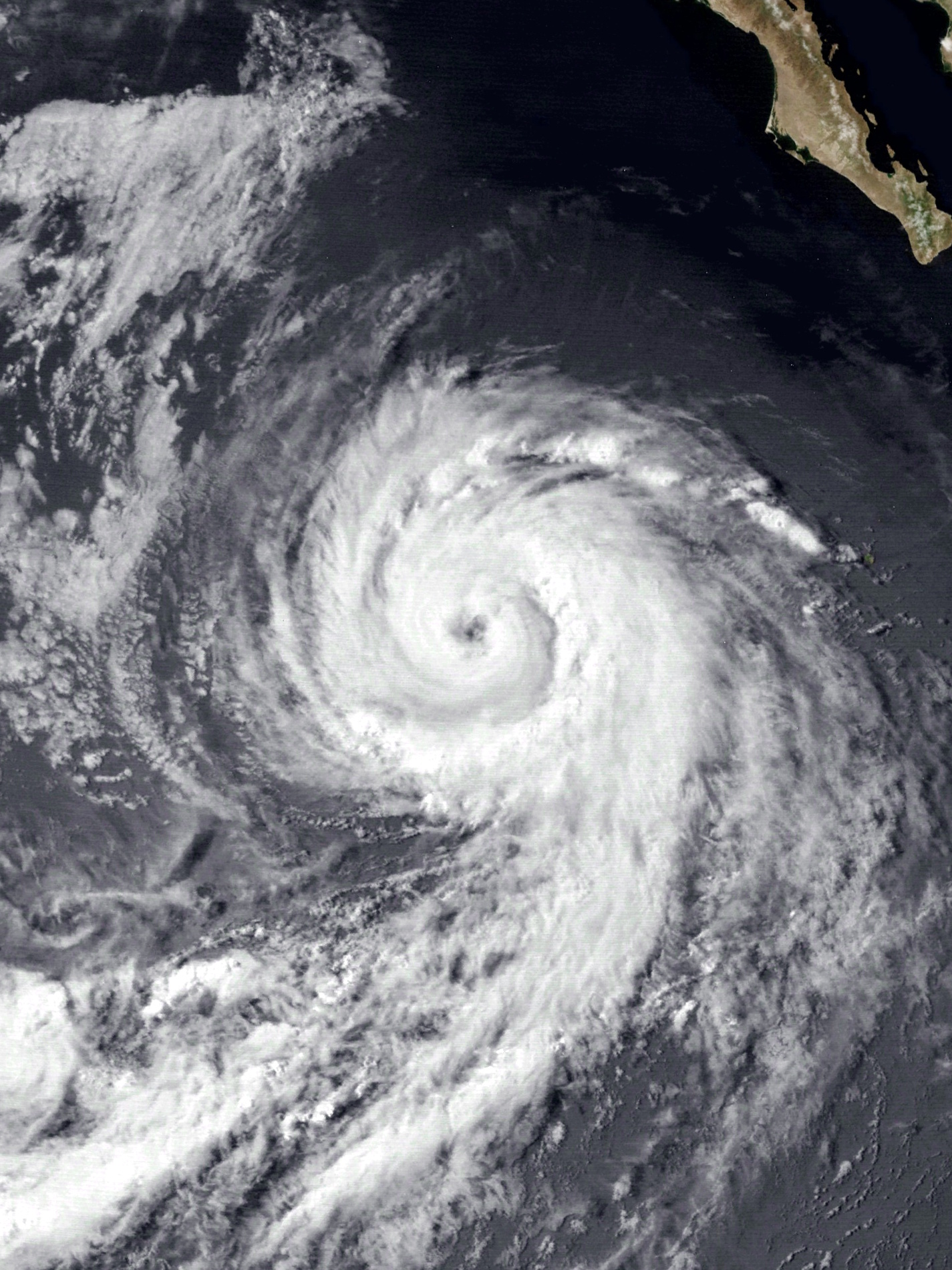
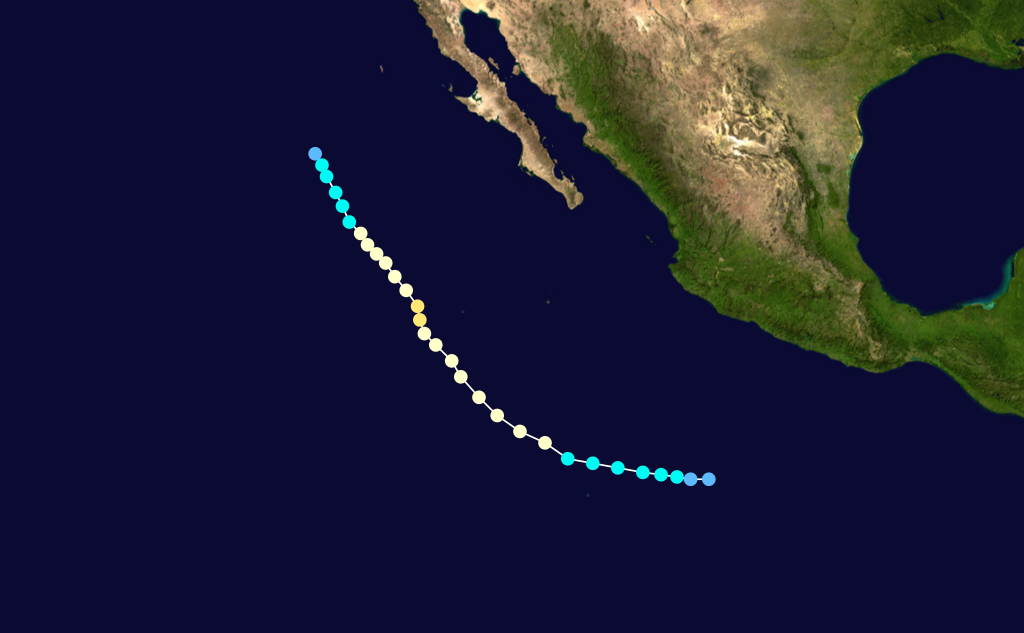
- Duration: July 31 – August 7
- Peak intensity: 105 mph (165 km/h) (1-min);

A tropical disturbance south of Acapulco developed into a tropical depression on July 31. It headed west, and then gradually curved to the northwest as it paralleled the coast of Mexico. The cyclone became a storm shortly after forming, a hurricane on August 2, and peaked in windspeed on August 4. It then steadily weakened after that, and dissipated over cool waters shortly after becoming a tropical depression on August 7. Howard threatened the coasts of Southern California and the northern part of the Baja California Peninsula, but in the end, never approached land.

=== Hurricane Isis ===
- Category 2 hurricane (SSHWS)
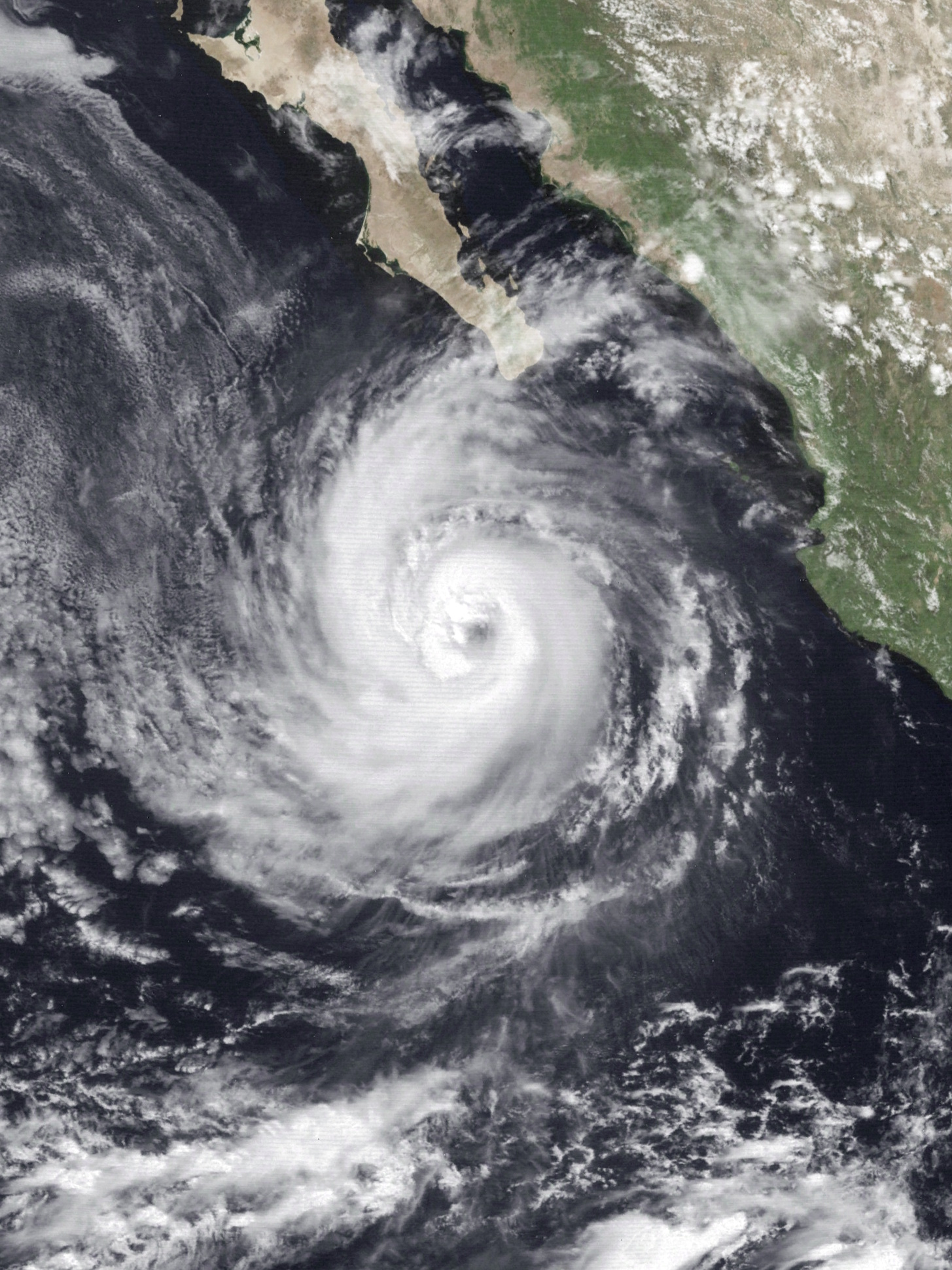
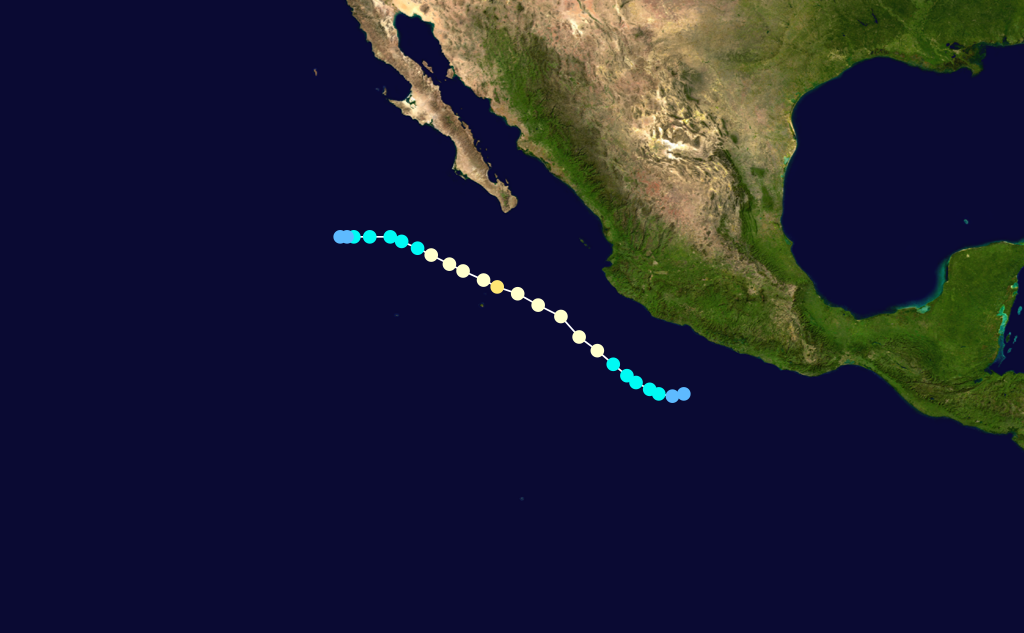
- Duration: August 5 – August 11
- Peak intensity: 100 mph (155 km/h) (1-min);

A tropical disturbance south of Acapulco developed into a tropical depression on August 5 and a tropical storm the next day. Isis headed generally west-northwest and peaked as a Category 2 hurricane on August 8. Isis then weakened, becoming a tropical storm on August 10, turning to the west, and dissipating the next day.

=== Hurricane Javier ===
- Category 3 hurricane (SSHWS)
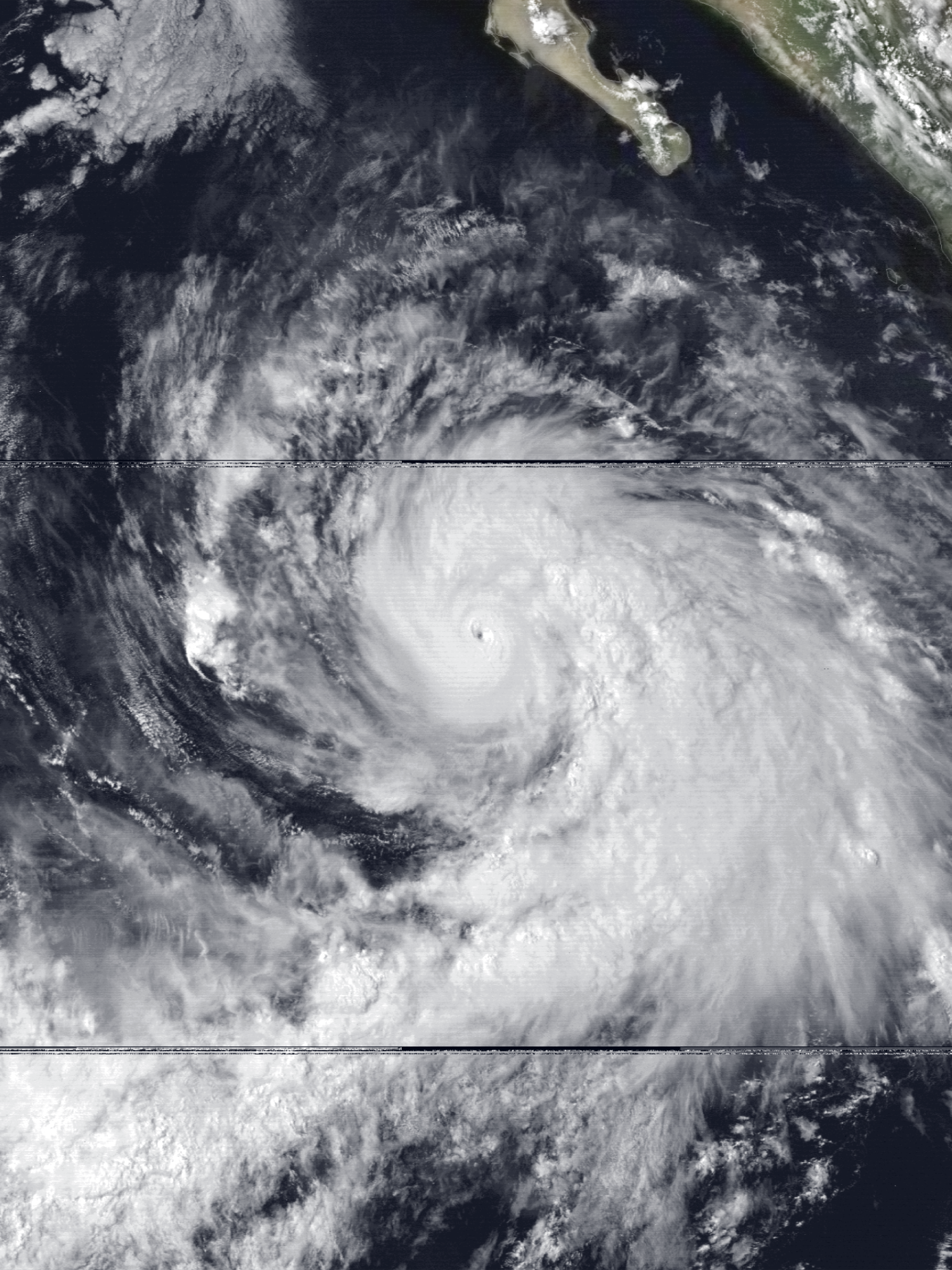
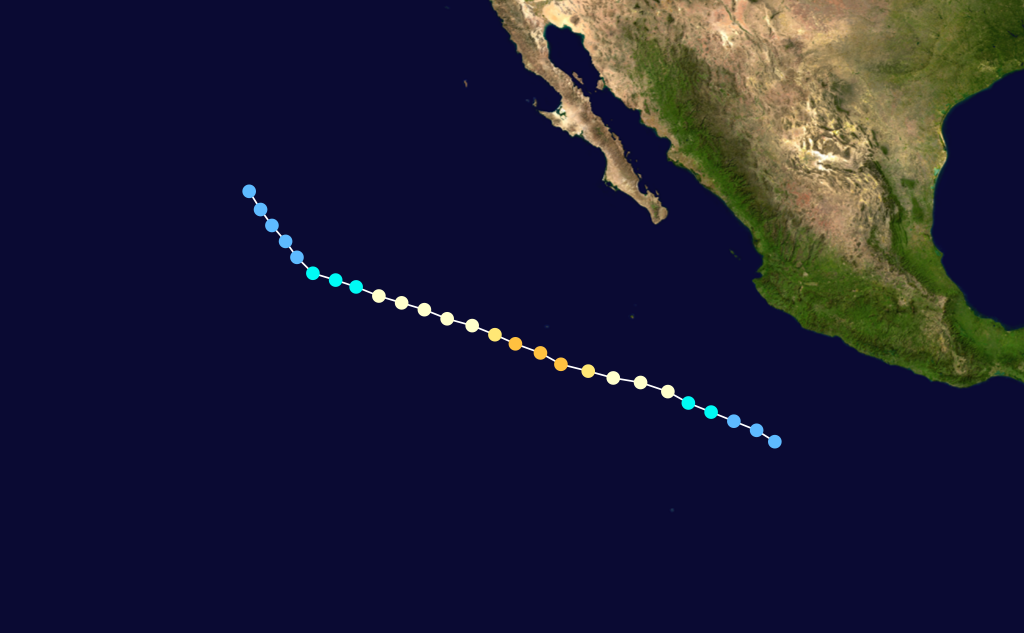
- Duration: August 22 – August 29
- Peak intensity: 115 mph (185 km/h) (1-min);

An area of disturbed weather south of the Gulf of Tehuantepec became a tropical depression on August 22 and a storm the next day. Javier became a hurricane on August 24 and peaked as a major hurricane on August 25. Javier then weakened, becoming a tropical storm on August 27 and a storm the next day. It dissipated on August 29, having moved west-northwest for almost its entire life.

=== Hurricane Kay ===
- Category 4 hurricane (SSHWS)
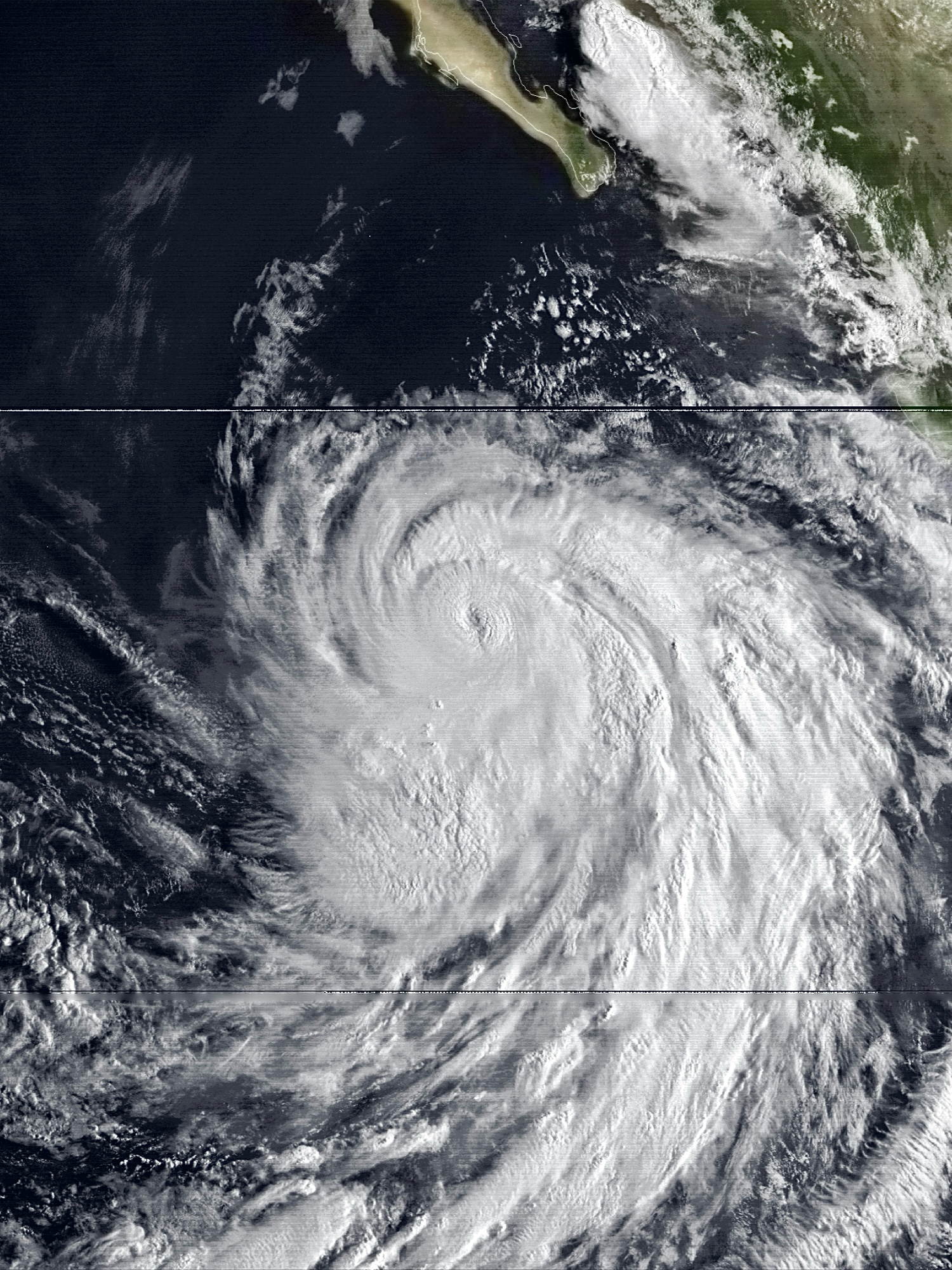
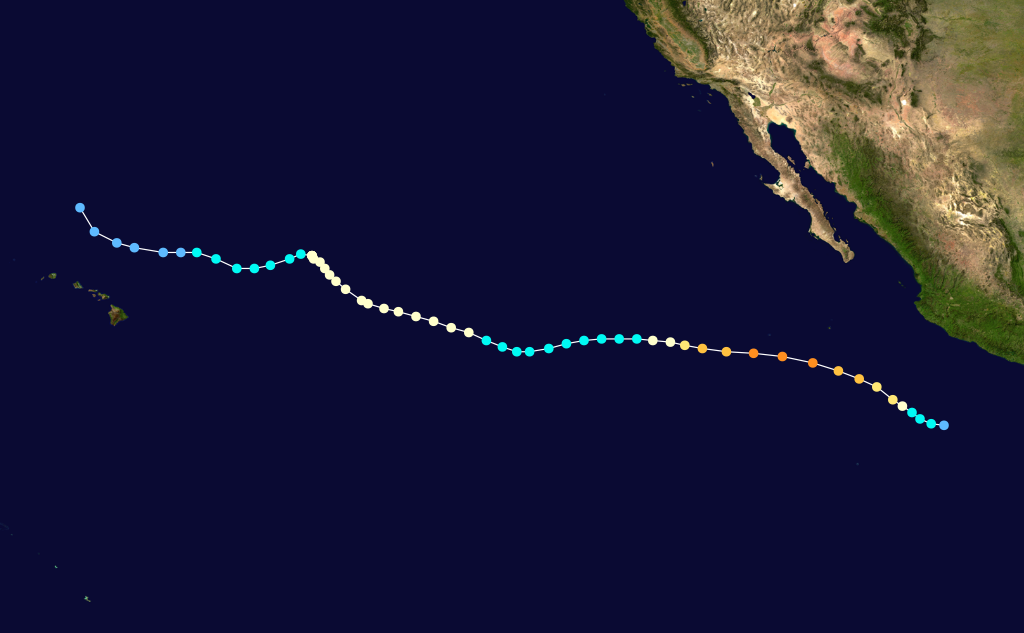
- Duration: September 16 – September 30
- Peak intensity: 140 mph (220 km/h) (1-min);

A tropical disturbance south of Acapulco developed into a tropical depression on September 16 and a tropical storm later that day. Kay headed in an irregular but generally west-northwest path out to sea. Kay strengthened into a hurricane on September 17. It continued strengthening and reached its peak as a Category 4 hurricane on the Saffir–Simpson scale on September 18. Kay then slowly weakened and was a tropical storm by September 20. Kay's forward motion slowed as it neared the central Pacific. It restrengthened into a hurricane on September 23, crossed 140°W, and entered the Central Pacific Hurricane Center's area of responsibility the next day. Kay executed a small anticyclonic loop, and then began weakening again. It became a tropical storm again on September 27, and a depression two days later. The cyclone dissipated on September 30 while located north of the Hawaiian Islands. Kay did not effect land, causing no damage or casualties. It was the strongest tropical cyclone of the season at 140 mph (225 km/h). Kay lasted for 14.5 days, enough to make it the fifth-longest-lasting Pacific hurricane at the time.

=== Tropical Storm Lester ===
- Tropical storm (SSHWS)
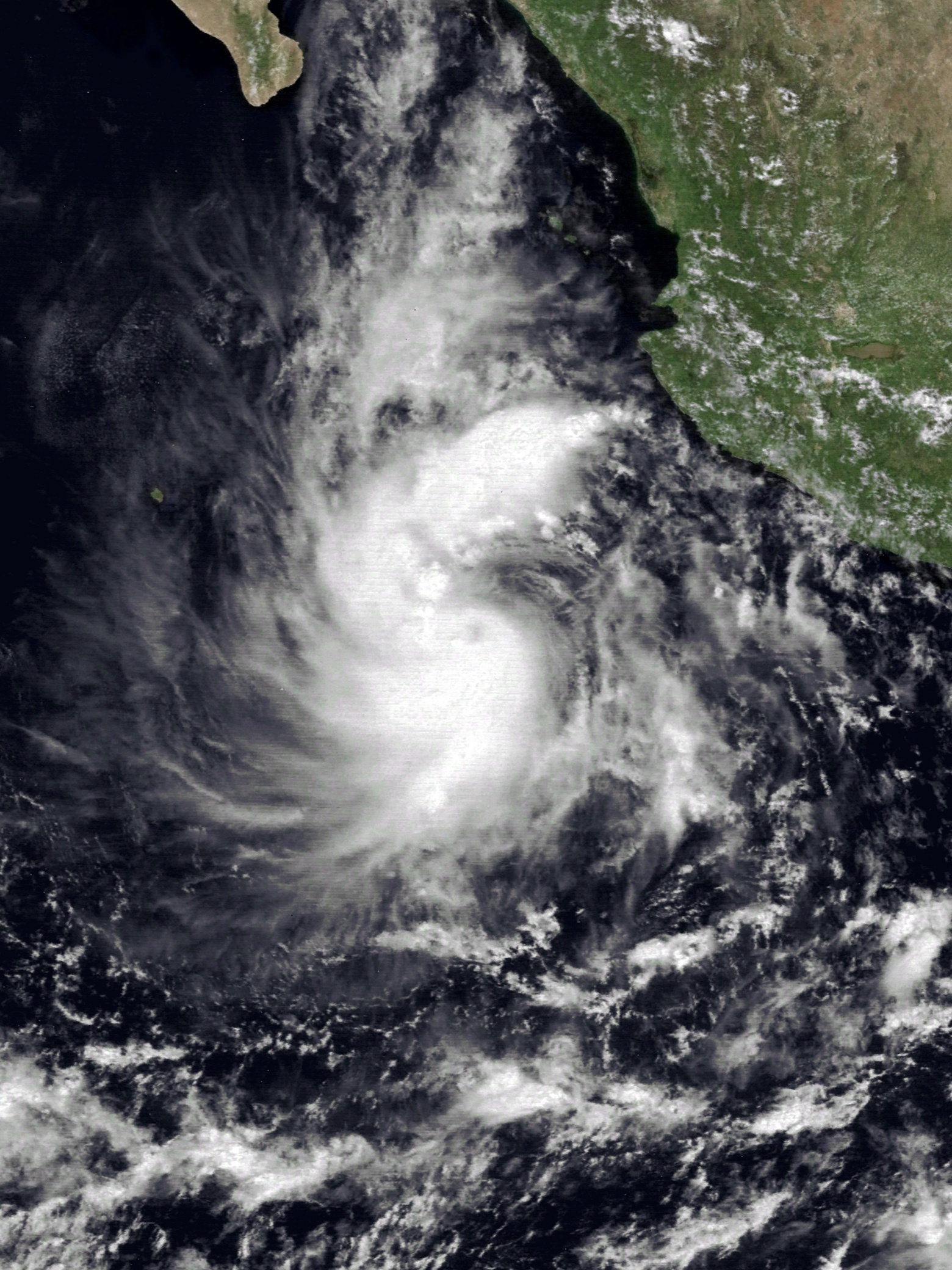
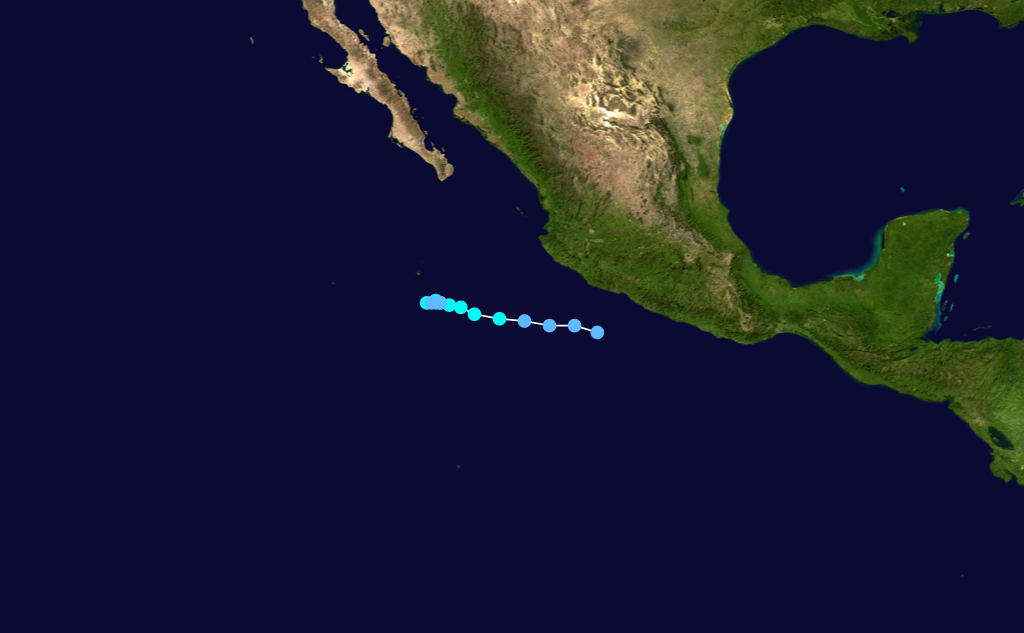
- Duration: September 21 – September 25
- Peak intensity: 40 mph (65 km/h) (1-min);

A westward-moving disturbance south of Acapulco strengthened into a tropical depression on September 21. Continuing on its path, it intensified into Tropical Storm Lester on September 23. Lester's motion then slowed down, and it spun about in the open ocean until it dissipated on September 25.

=== Tropical Storm Madeline ===
- Tropical storm (SSHWS)
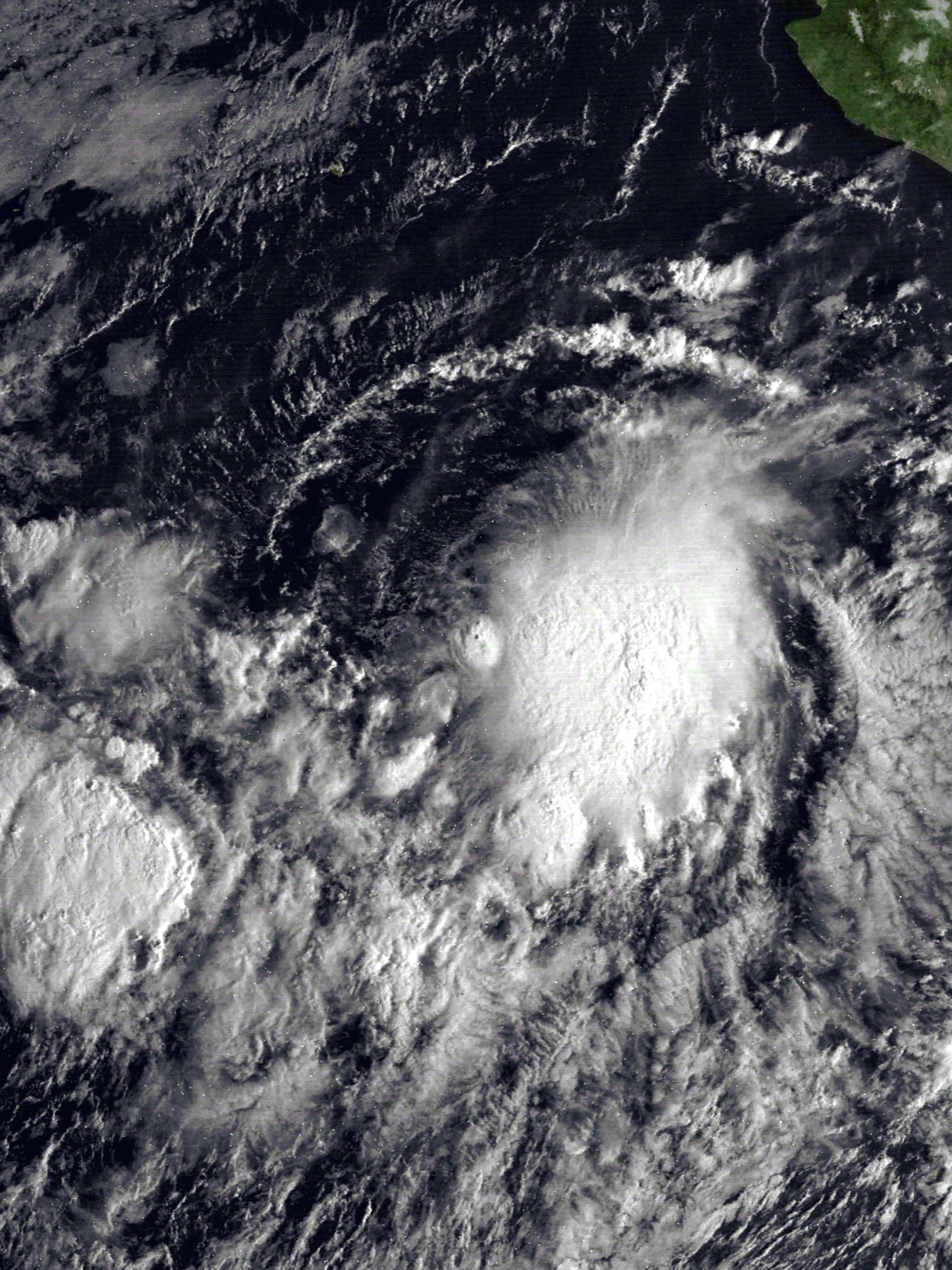
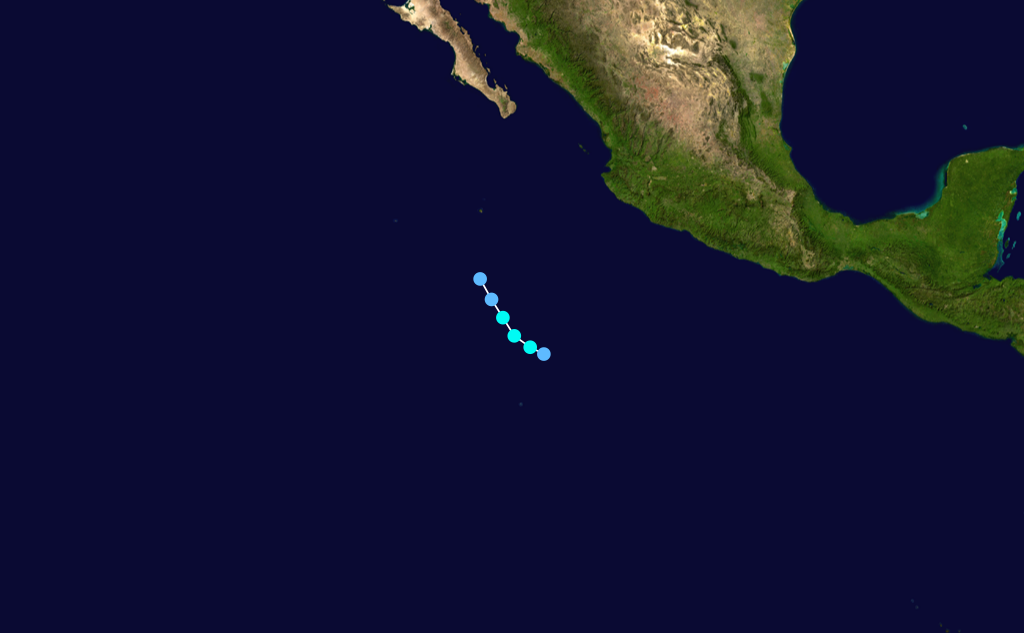
- Duration: October 11 – October 12
- Peak intensity: 50 mph (85 km/h) (1-min);

A disturbance east of Clipperton became a tropical depression and then a tropical storm. It headed northwest and weakened into a depression on October 12. It dissipated shortly afterward.

=== Tropical Storm Newton ===
- Tropical storm (SSHWS)
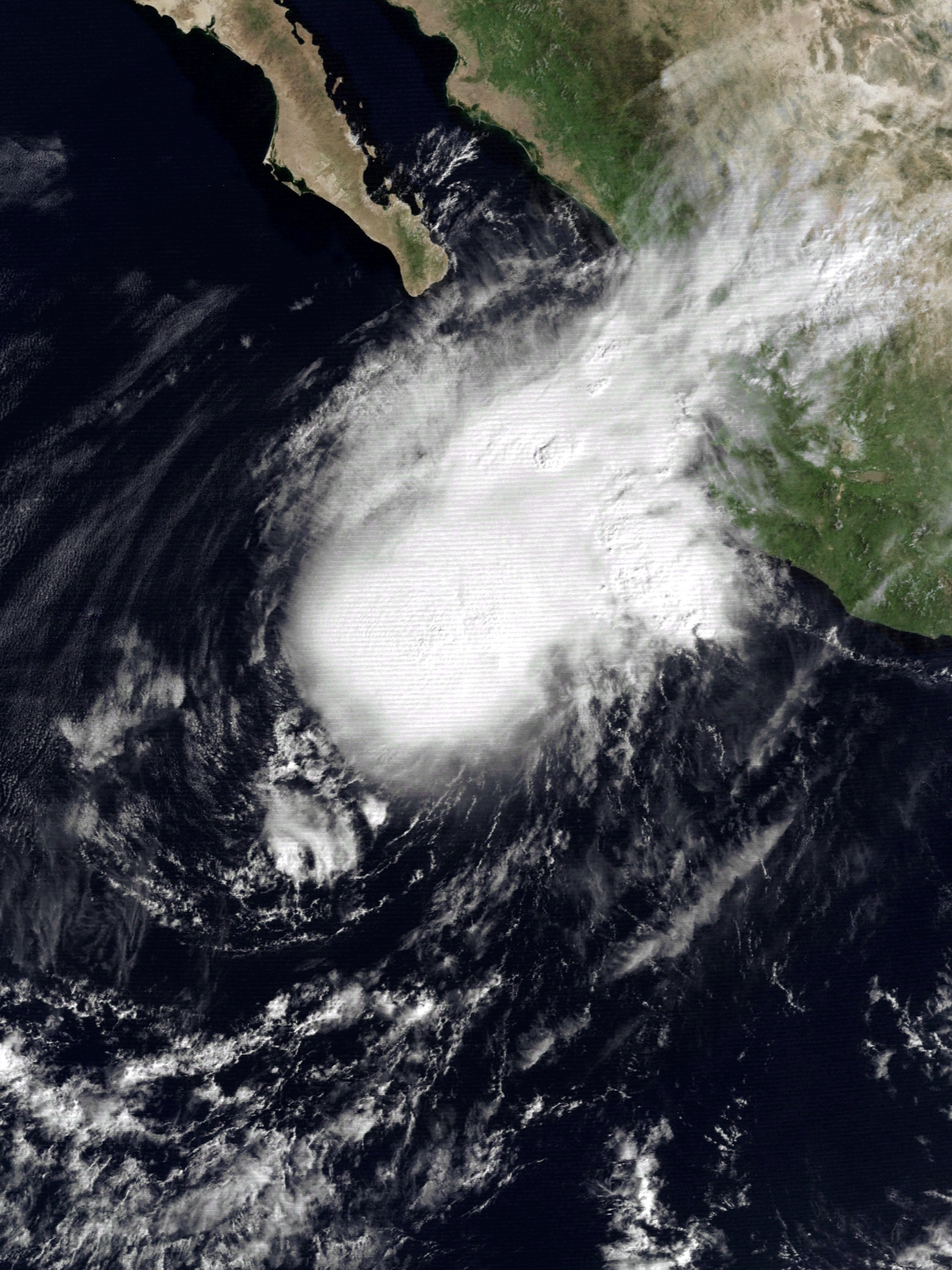
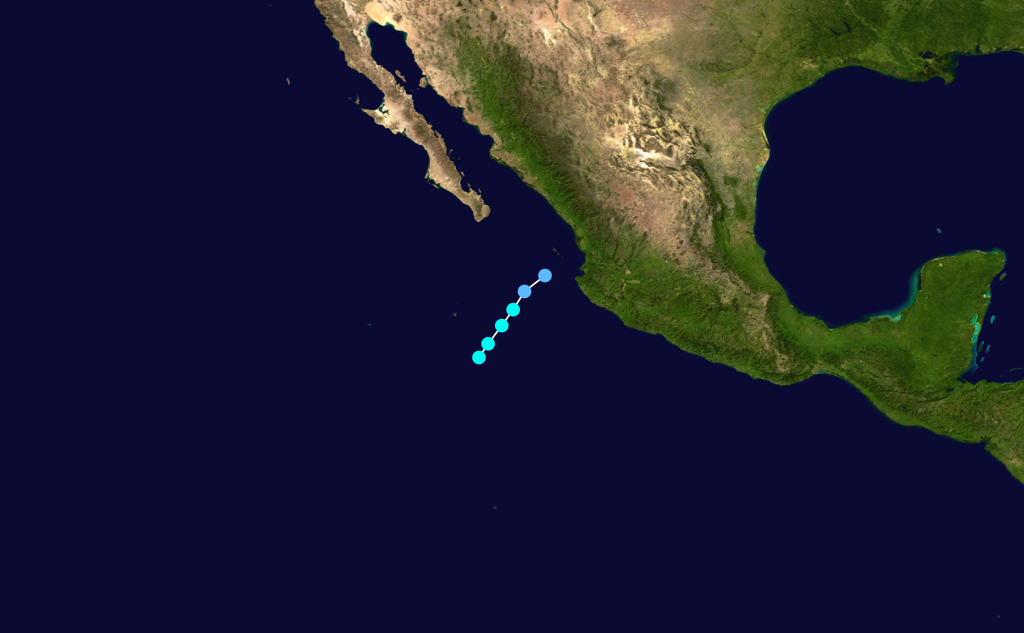
- Duration: October 28 – October 29
- Peak intensity: 40 mph (65 km/h) (1-min);

An area of disturbed weather southeast of Socorro Island became a tropical storm on October 28. It headed northeast and approached the coast of Mexico. However, an area of high wind shear and cool waters destroyed the cyclone on October 29, before it could reach the coast. Newton was the tropical cyclone that came closest to making landfall this season. However, no impact was reported.

== Storm names ==
The following list of names was used for named storms that formed in the North Pacific Ocean east of 140°W in 1980. Most of these names were used for the first time, except for Agatha, Estelle, Georgette, and Madeline, which were previously used in the old four-year lists. No names were retired from this list following the season, and it was next used for the 1986 season.

- Agatha
- Blas
- Celia
- Darby
- Estelle
- Frank
- Georgette
- Howard
- Isis
- Javier
- Kay *
- Lester
- Madeline
- Newton
- Orlene (unused)
- Paine (unused)
- Roslyn (unused)
- Seymour (unused)
- Tina (unused)
- Virgil (unused)
- Winifred (unused)

The following list of names was in place for naming storms that formed in the North Pacific from 140°W to the International Date Line in 1980. It was one of five lists of Hawaiian names using the 12 letters of the Hawaiian alphabet. These sets of names were to be cycled on an annual rotation basis beginning with the "A" name each year. It went unused however, as Carmen was named from the western Pacific typhoon name list by the Joint Typhoon Warning Center due to its proximity to the Date Line at time of formation. One named storm in the table above crossed into the area from the east during the season (*).

- Akoni (unused)
- Eme (unused)
- Halola (unused)
- Iune (unused)
- Kika (unused)
- Luke (unused)
- Malulani (unused)
- Napua (unused)
- Oliwa (unused)
- Puamele (unused)
- Uleki (unused)
- Wila (unused)

== Season effects ==
1980 Pacific hurricane season statistics
Storm name	Dates active	Storm category at peak intensity	Max 1-min wind mph (km/h)	Min. press. (mbar)	Areas affected	Damage (US$)	Deaths	Ref(s).
Carmen	April 4-8	Tropical storm	50 (85)	Unknown	None	None	None	
Agatha	June 9-15	Category 3 hurricane	115 (185)	Unknown	None	None	None	
Blas	June 16-19	Tropical storm	60 (95)	Unknown	None	None	None	
Three-E	June 17-19	Tropical depression	35 (55)	Unknown	Western Mexico	None	None	
Celia	June 25-29	Category 1 hurricane	75 (120)	Unknown	California	None	None	
Darby	July 1-3	Tropical storm	50 (85)	Unknown	None	None	None	
Estelle	July 12-13	Tropical storm	45 (75)	Unknown	None	None	None	
Frank	July 18-22	Tropical storm	50 (85)	Unknown	None	None	None	
Georgette	July 28-31	Category 1 hurricane	75 (120)	Unknown	Socorro Island	None	None	
Howard	July 31-August 7	Category 2 hurricane	105 (165)	Unknown	None	None	None	
Isis	August 5-11	Category 2 hurricane	100 (155)	Unknown	Western Mexico, Socorro Island	None	None	
Javier	August 22-29	Category 3 hurricane	115 (185)	Unknown	None	None	None	
Kay	September 16-30	Category 4 hurricane	140 (220)	Unknown	Hawaii	None	None	
Lester	September 21-25	Tropical storm	40 (65)	Unknown	Southwestern Mexico	None	None	
Madeline	October 11-12	Tropical storm	50 (85)	Unknown	None	None	None	
Newton	October 28-29	Tropical storm	40 (65)	Unknown	Western Mexico	None	None	
Season aggregates
16 systems	April 4-October 29		140 (220)	Unknown		None	None	

== See also ==
- List of Pacific hurricanes
- Pacific hurricane season
- 1980 Atlantic hurricane season
- 1980 Pacific typhoon season
- 1980 North Indian Ocean cyclone season
- Australian cyclone seasons: 1979–80, 1980–81
- South Pacific cyclone seasons: 1979–80, 1980–81
- South-West Indian Ocean cyclone seasons: 1979–80, 1980–81
