= 1980–81 Australian region cyclone season =

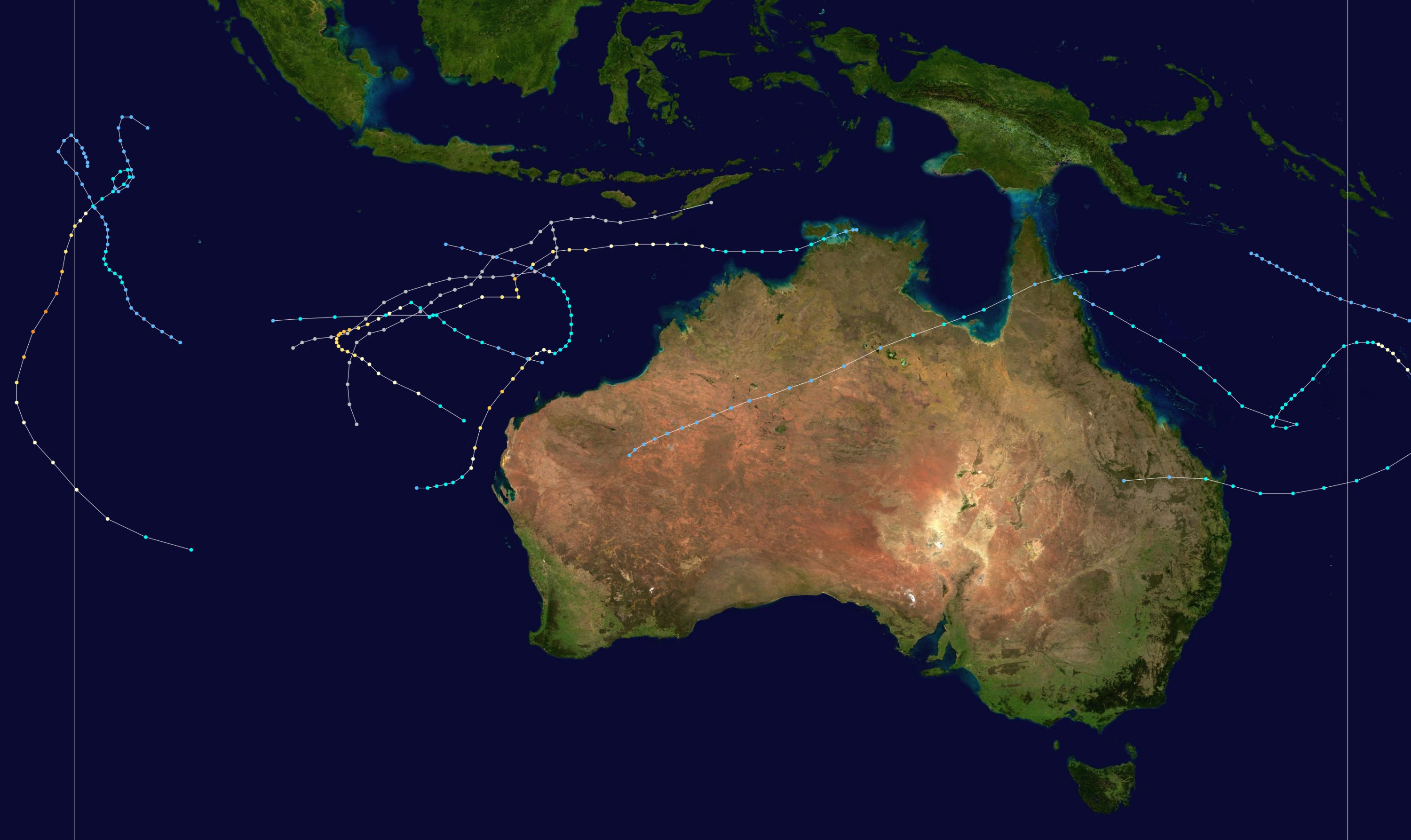
- Season summary map

Seasonal boundaries
- First system formed: 3 November 1980
- Last system dissipated: 30 May 1981

Strongest storm
- Name: Mabel
  - Maximum winds: 205 km/h (125 mph) (10-minute sustained)
  - Lowest pressure: 930 hPa (mbar)

Seasonal statistics
- Tropical lows: 14
- Tropical cyclones: 14
- Severe tropical cyclones: 10
- Total fatalities: >1
- Total damage: Unknown

Related articles
- 1980–81 South-West Indian Ocean cyclone season; 1980–81 South Pacific cyclone season

The 1980–81 Australian region cyclone season was an above average tropical cyclone season. It officially started on 1 November 1980 and officially ended on 30 April 1981.

== Systems ==
=== Severe Tropical Cyclone Alice–Adelaide ===
- Category 4 severe tropical cyclone (Australian scale)
- Category 3 tropical cyclone (SSHWS)
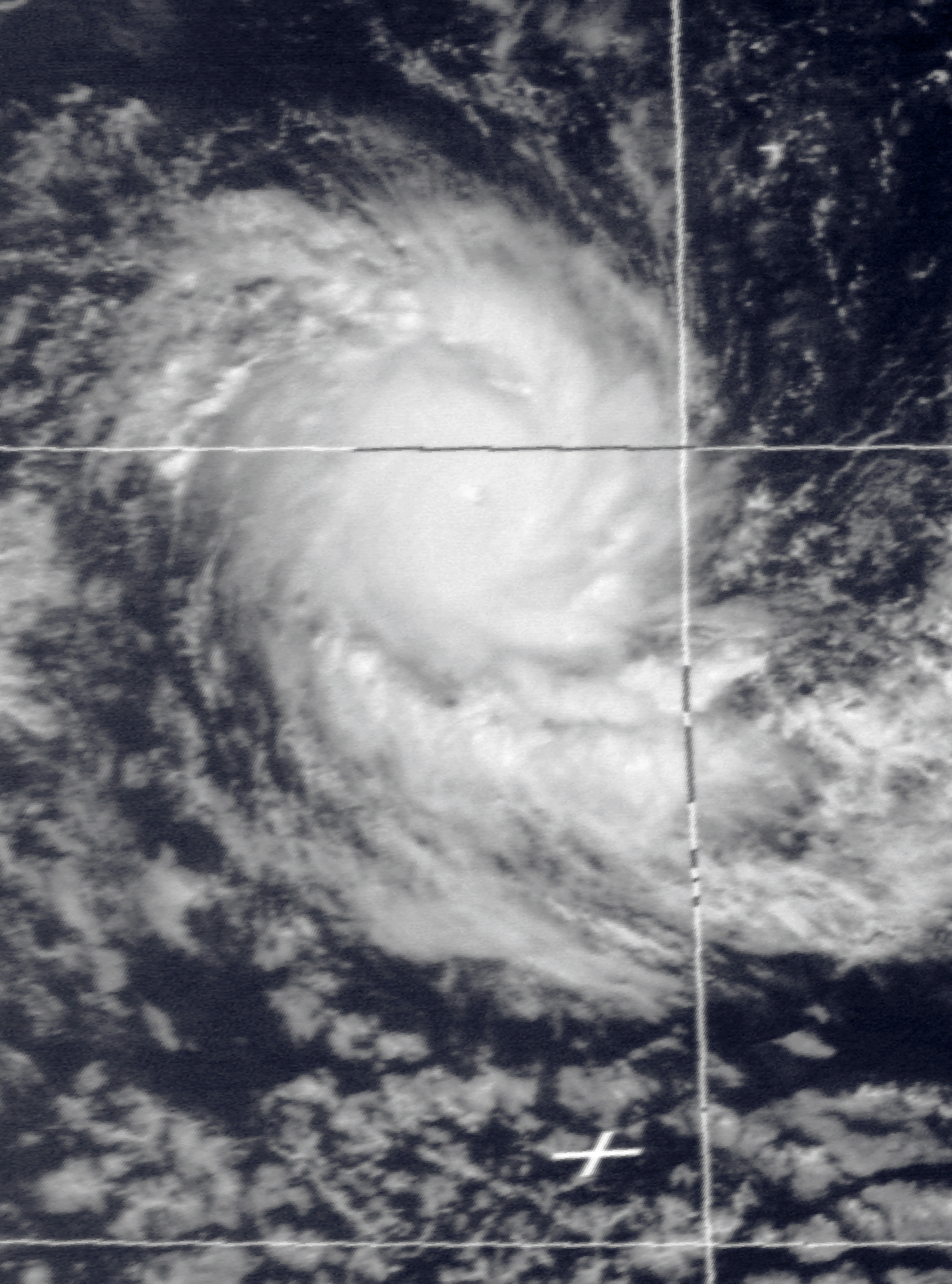
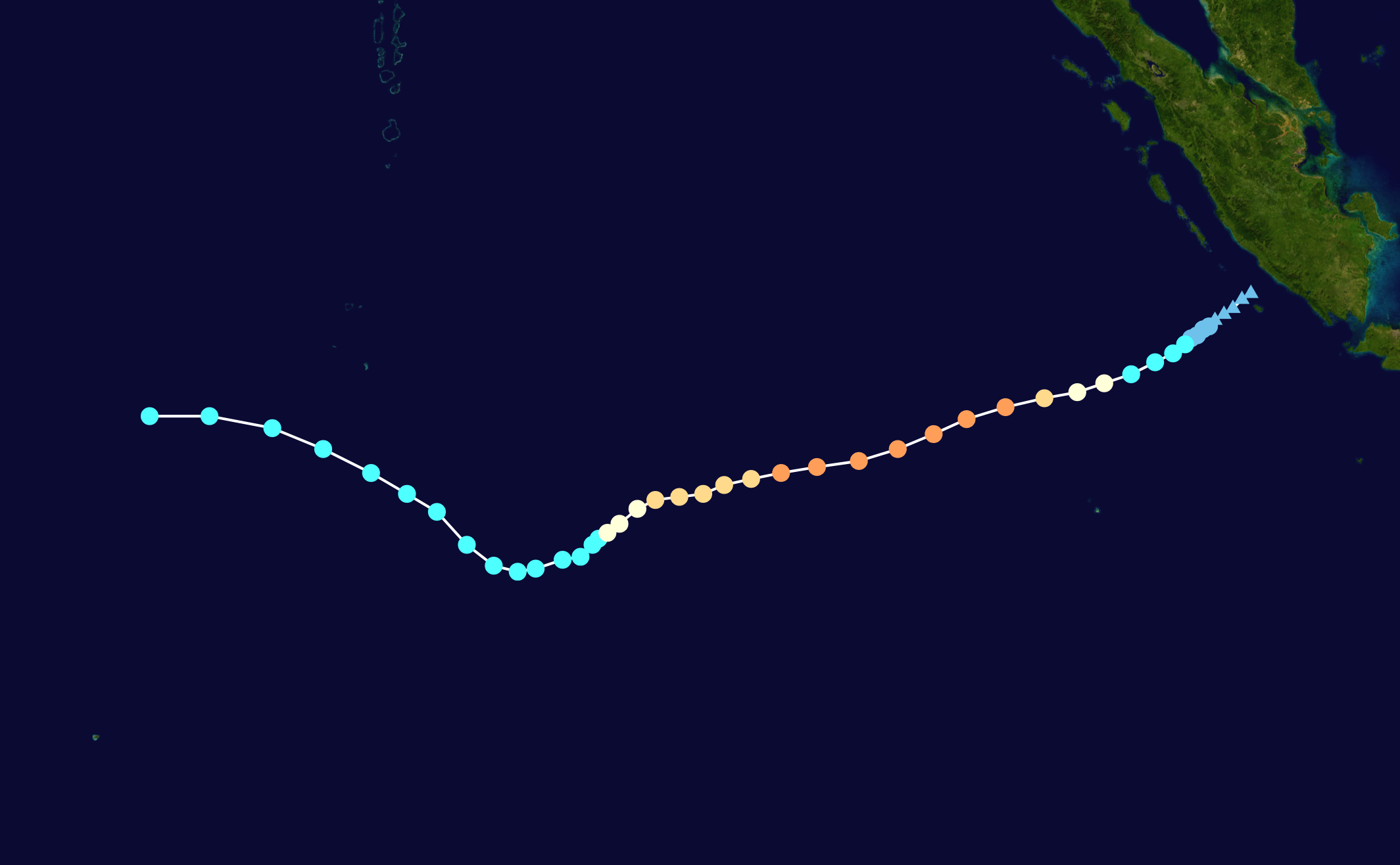
- Duration: 3 November – 10 November (Exited basin)
- Peak intensity: 195 km/h (120 mph) (10-min); 940 hPa (mbar)

Formed on 3 November, just south of Selat Mentawai then moved southwestward before reaching a peak intensity of 110 knots (130 mph; 200 km/h) and a minimum pressure of 940.0 hectopascals (27.76 inHg) on 8 November. On 12 November the storm began to move northwestward and two days later dissipated over the open Indian Ocean.

=== Severe Tropical Cyclone Bert–Christelle ===
- Category 3 severe tropical cyclone (Australian scale)
- Category 1 tropical cyclone (SSHWS)
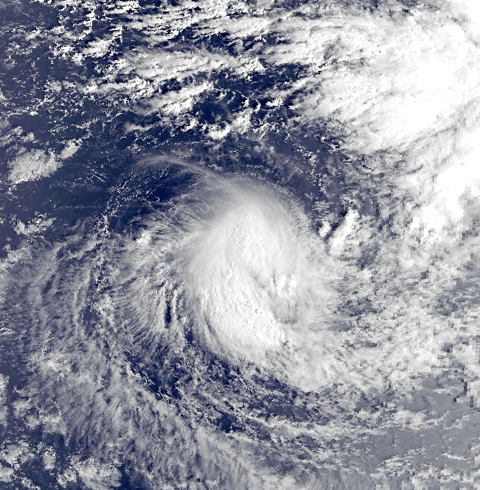
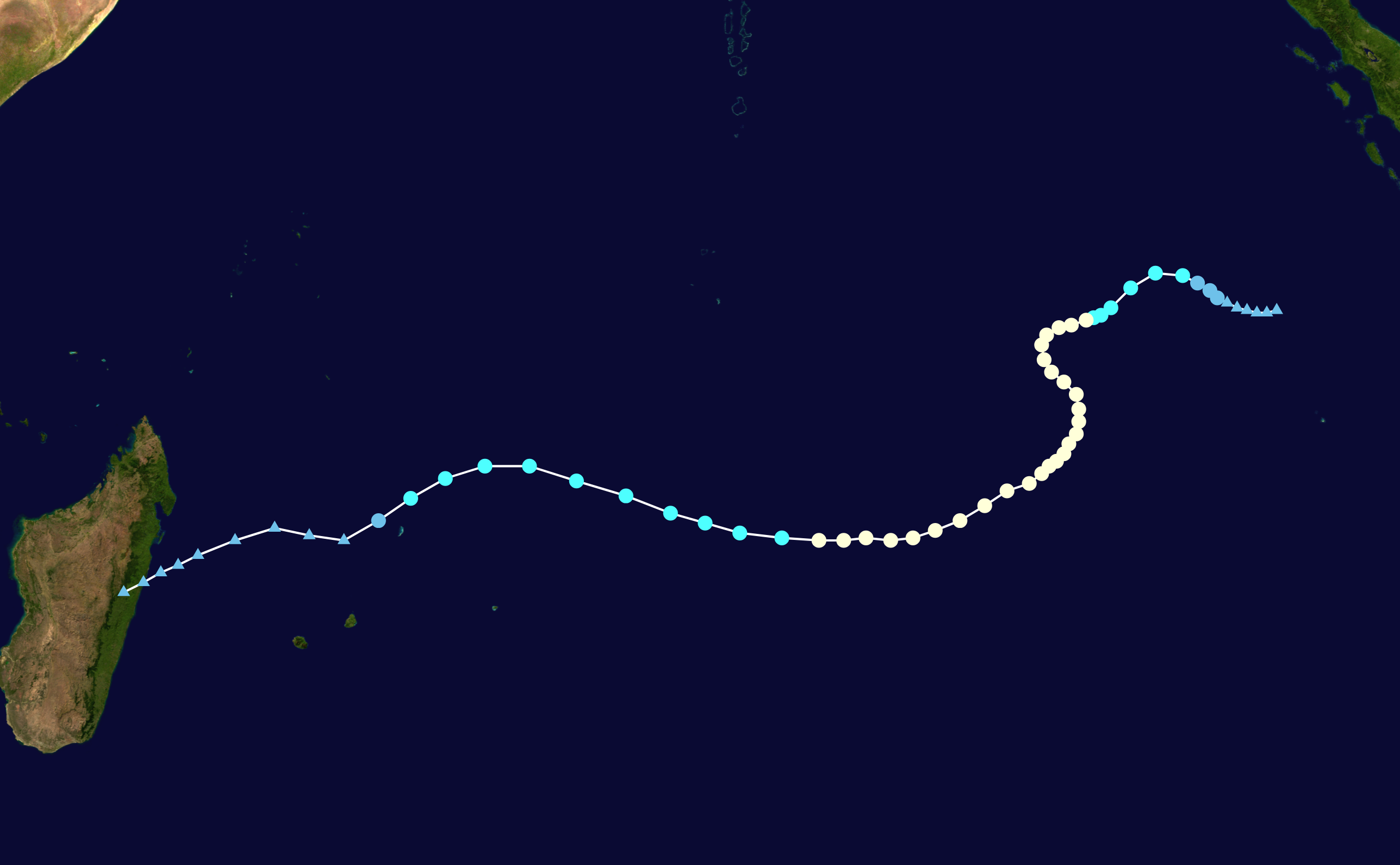
- Duration: 24 November – 3 December (Exited basin)
- Peak intensity: 150 km/h (90 mph) (10-min); 965 hPa (mbar)

The origins of Cyclone Bert–Christelle can be traced to a quasistationary convergence zone that spread across Indonesia to north of the Cocos Islands. Bert–Christelle was slow to organize but began to show signs of organization on November 26. Later on that day, the disturbance gained sufficient organization, noted by curved cloudbands, to be classified as Cyclone Bert. The cyclone moved to the southwest, gradually intensifying and attained a peak intensity of 150 km/h (95 mph) and a barometric pressure of 965 hPa (28.49 inHg) on November 29. Bert continued the same westerly motion and exited the basin on December 3. It was subsequently named Christelle by Météo France.

=== Severe Tropical Cyclone Carol ===
- Category 5 severe tropical cyclone (Australian scale)
- Category 3 tropical cyclone (SSHWS)
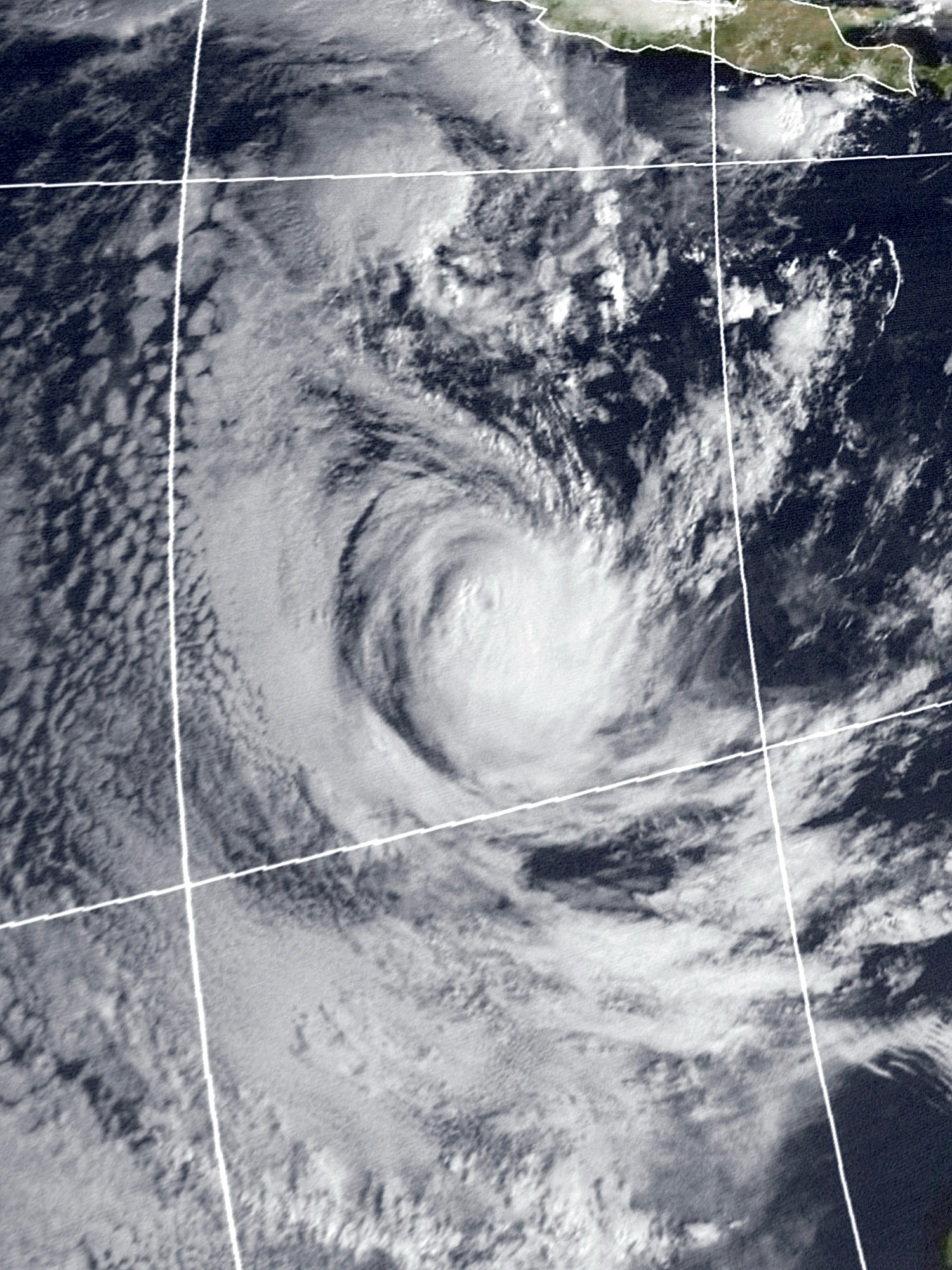
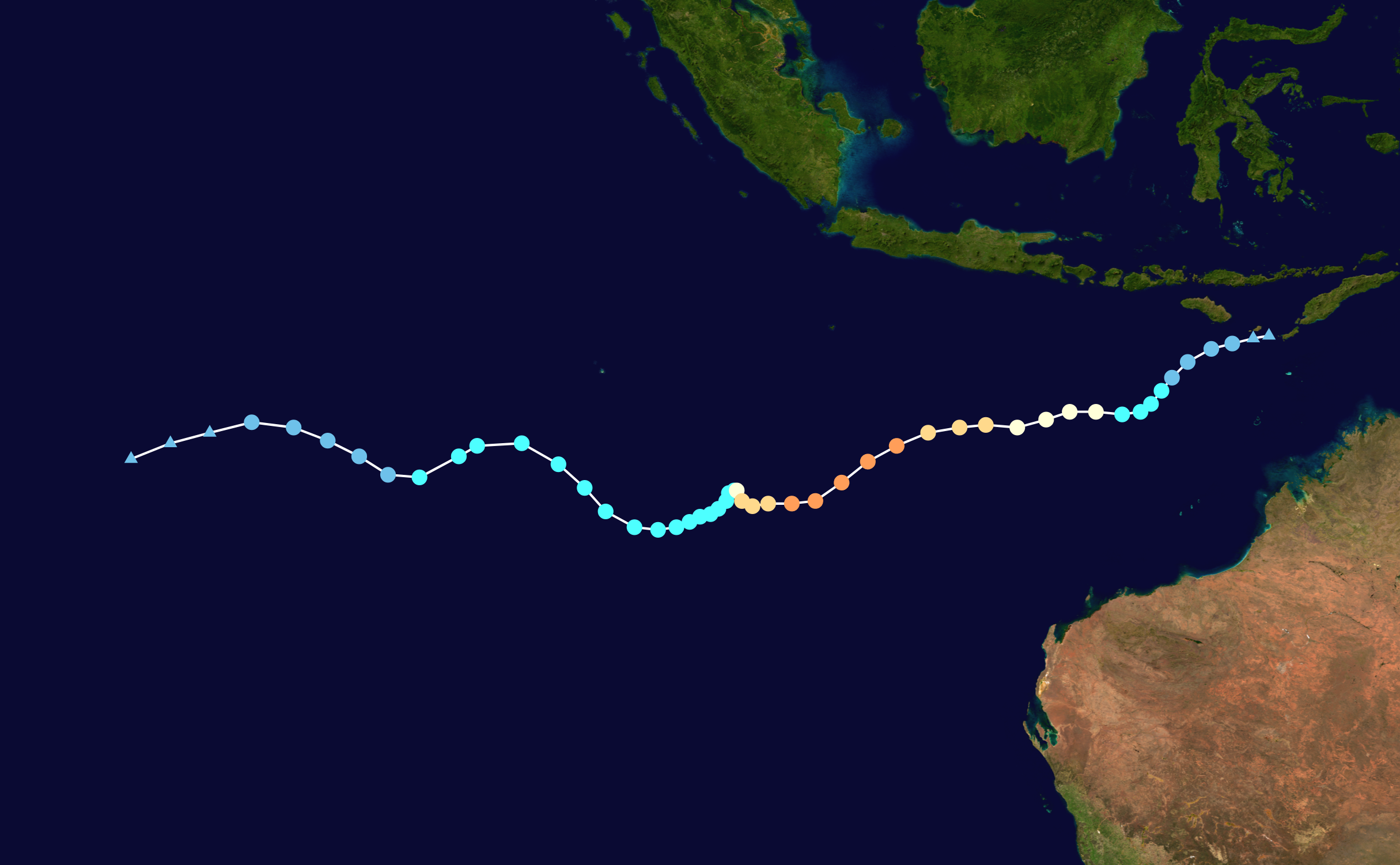
- Duration: 12 December – 22 December
- Peak intensity: 205 km/h (125 mph) (10-min); 940 hPa (mbar)

Cyclone Carol formed from a weak area of low pressure to the southwest of Timor on December 12. While moving to the southwest, the disturbance developed banding features and was classified as Cyclone Carol. As Carol moved to the west, it intensified and peaked at 195 km/h (120 mph) with a barometric pressure of 940 hPa (27.76 inHg) on December 16. Briefly, both Carol and Dan exhibited a Fujiwhara interaction around December 17 due to their close proximity to each other. Carol began to impart wind shear on nearby Cyclone Dan, ultimately leading to its demise. Carol continued its track, but encountered strong wind shear and rapidly weakened. Carol's low level center became decoupled and continued to the west, where it dissipated on December 24.

=== Tropical Cyclone Dan ===
- Category 2 tropical cyclone (Australian scale)
- Tropical storm (SSHWS)
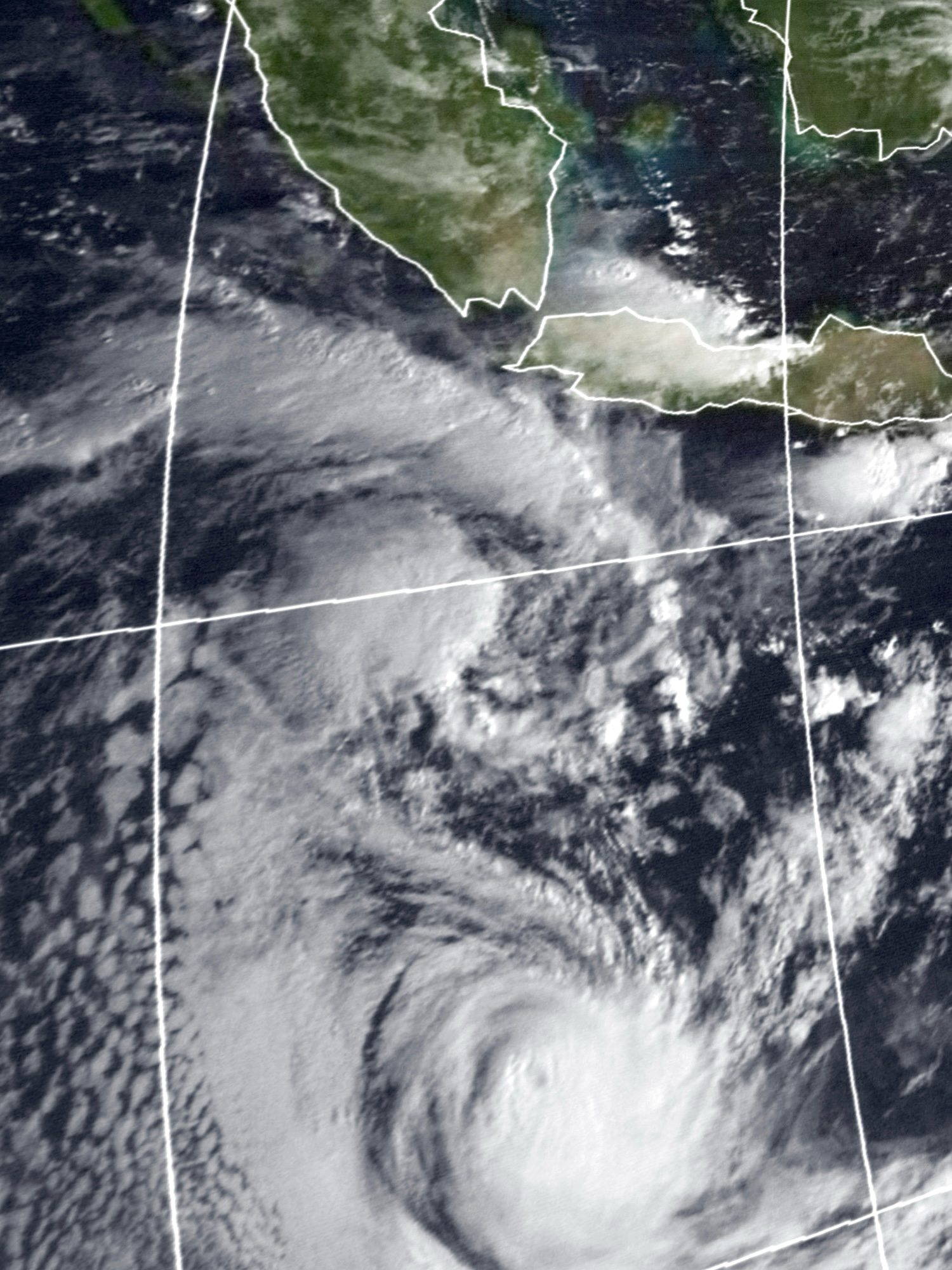
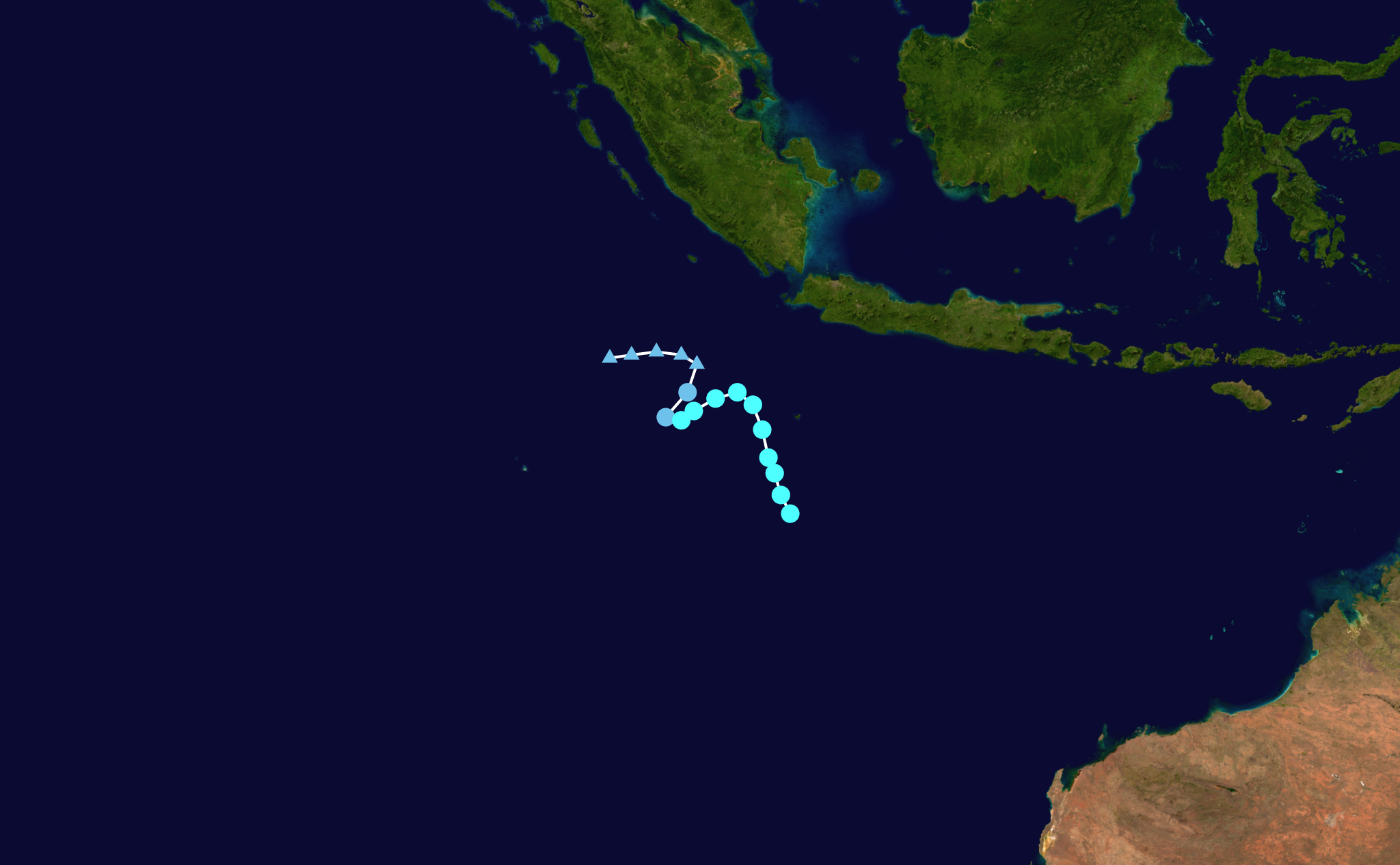
- Duration: 14 December – 18 December
- Peak intensity: 95 km/h (60 mph) (10-min); 985 hPa (mbar)

Cyclone Dan formed from an area of convection situated north of the Cocos Islands in mid-December. The tropical low moved eastwards and curved to the southwest, coalescing to form Dan. Dan's track shifted abruptly to the northeast from interacting with Carol, attaining a peak intensity of 95 km/h (60 mph) and 985 hPa (29.08 inHg) on December 16. Intensification quickly halted as strong upper-level flow from Cyclone Carol to its south sheared its cloudtops off. Dan's low level circulation moved erratically to the south and passed within 140 km west of Christmas Island on December 17, where winds of 74 km/h were observed. Dan ultimately dissipated around 370 km to the south of Christmas Island on December 18. Cyclone Dan is notable in that it traveled generally towards the southeast for the duration of its existence, which is uncommon for cyclones in the area.

=== Tropical Cyclone Edna ===
- Category 1 tropical cyclone (Australian scale)
- Tropical storm (SSHWS)
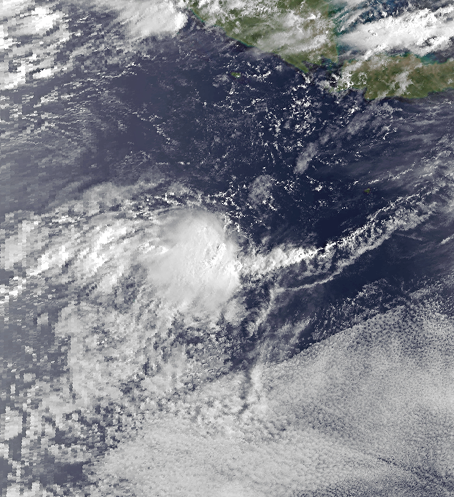
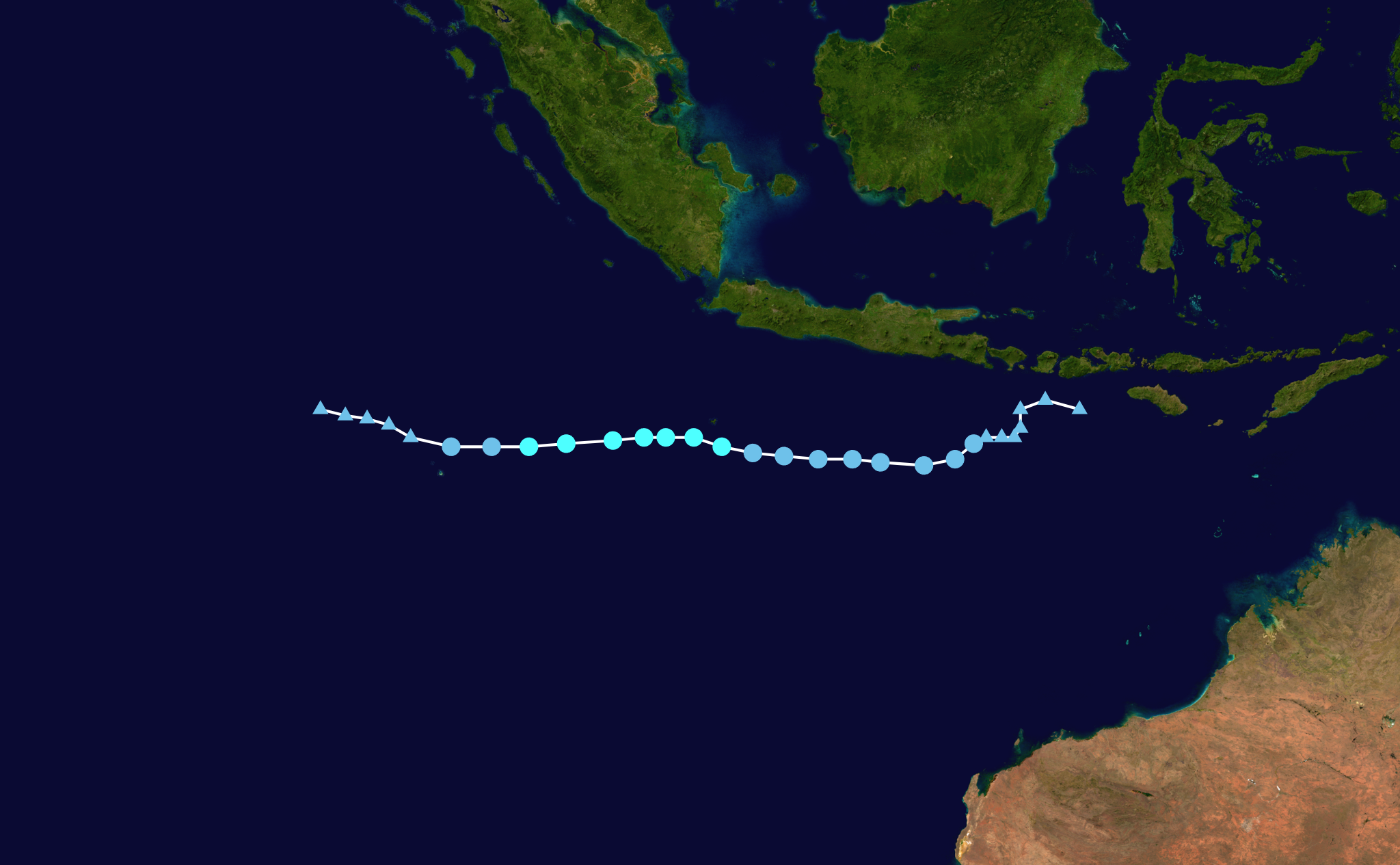
- Duration: 20 December – 27 December
- Peak intensity: 75 km/h (45 mph) (10-min); 994 hPa (mbar)

=== Severe Tropical Cyclone Felix ===
- Category 4 severe tropical cyclone (Australian scale)
- Category 3 tropical cyclone (SSHWS)
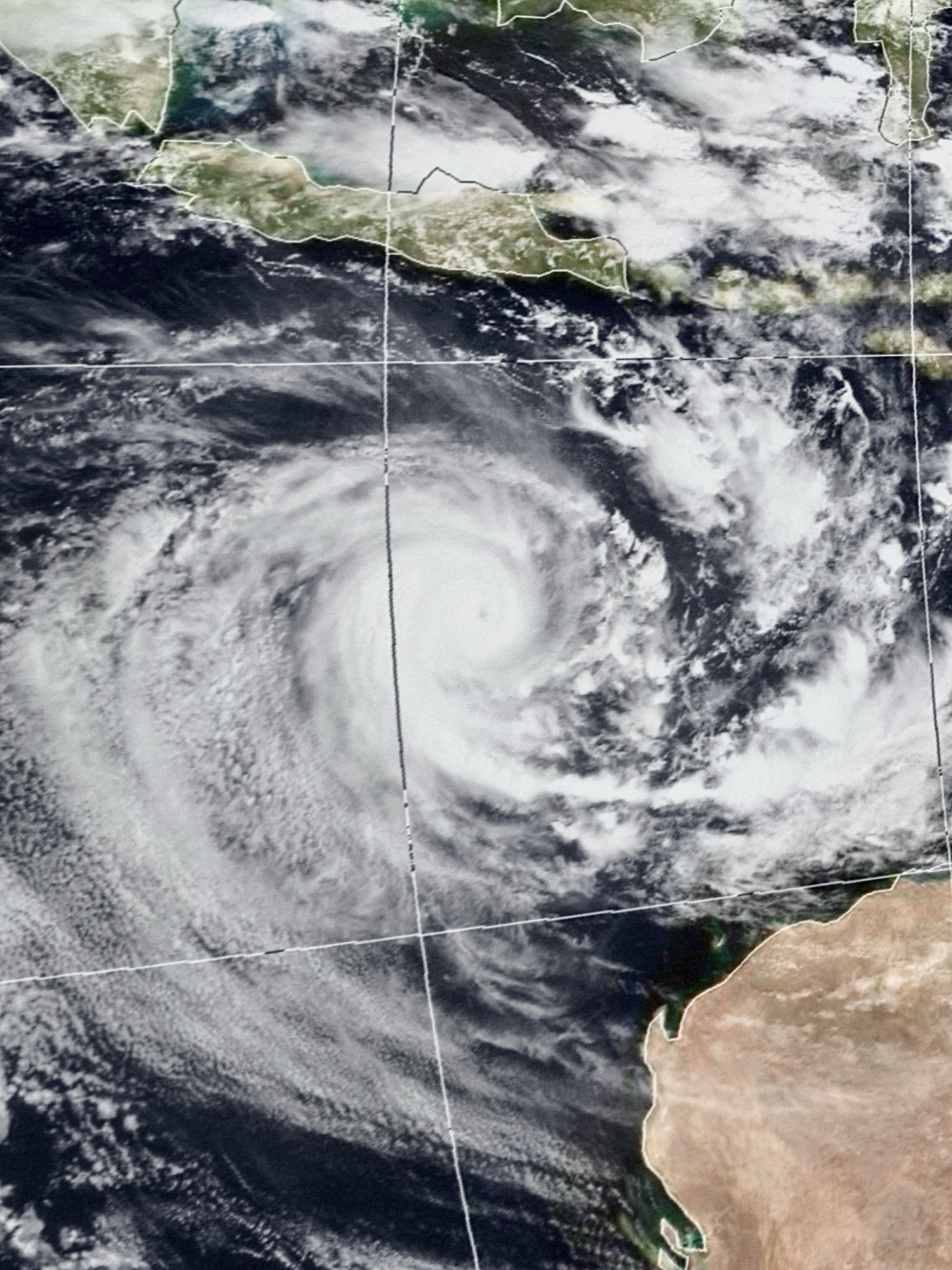
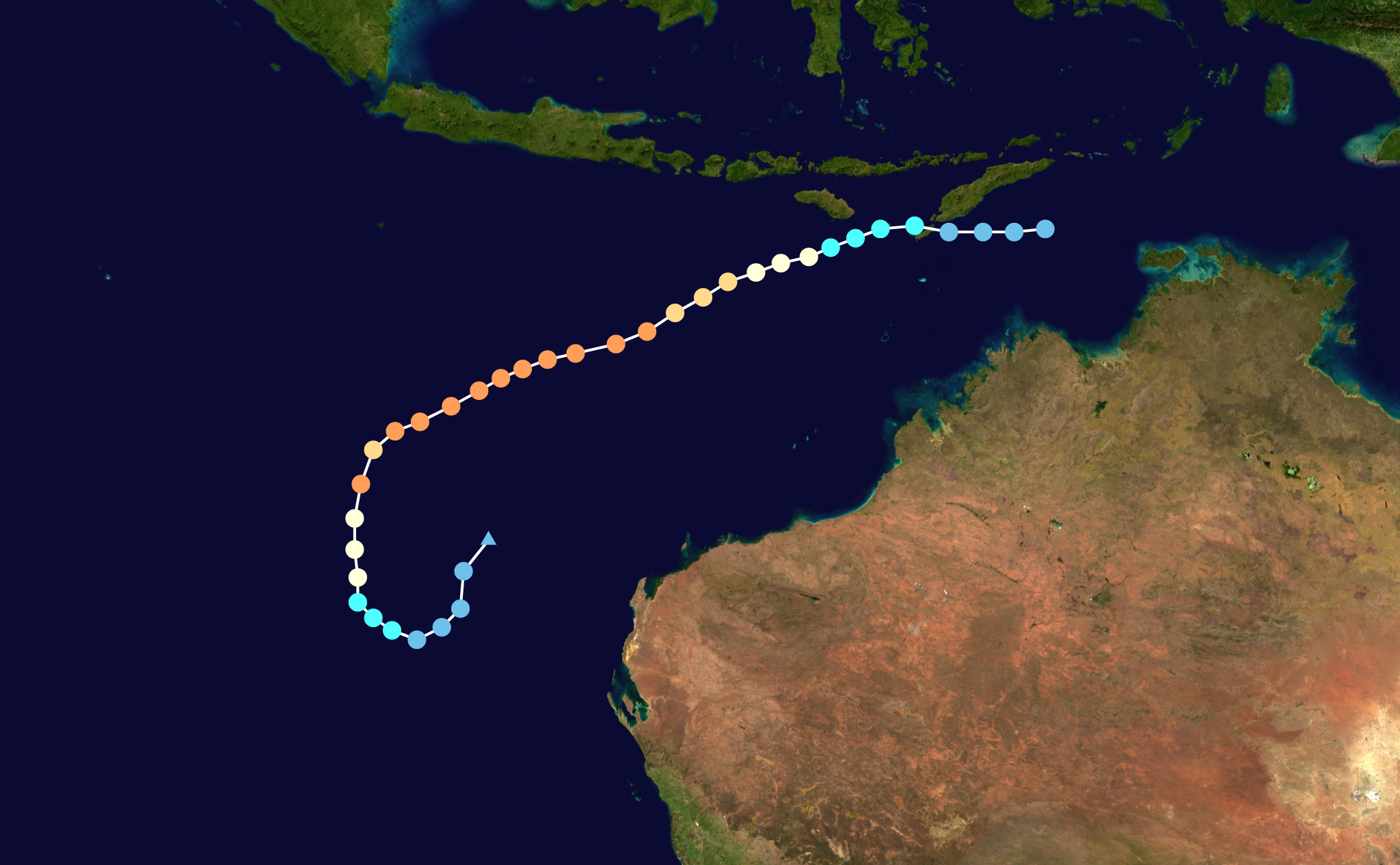
- Duration: 22 December – 31 December
- Peak intensity: 185 km/h (115 mph) (10-min); 940 hPa (mbar)

=== Severe Tropical Cyclone Mabel ===
- Category 5 severe tropical cyclone (Australian scale)
- Category 4 tropical cyclone (SSHWS)
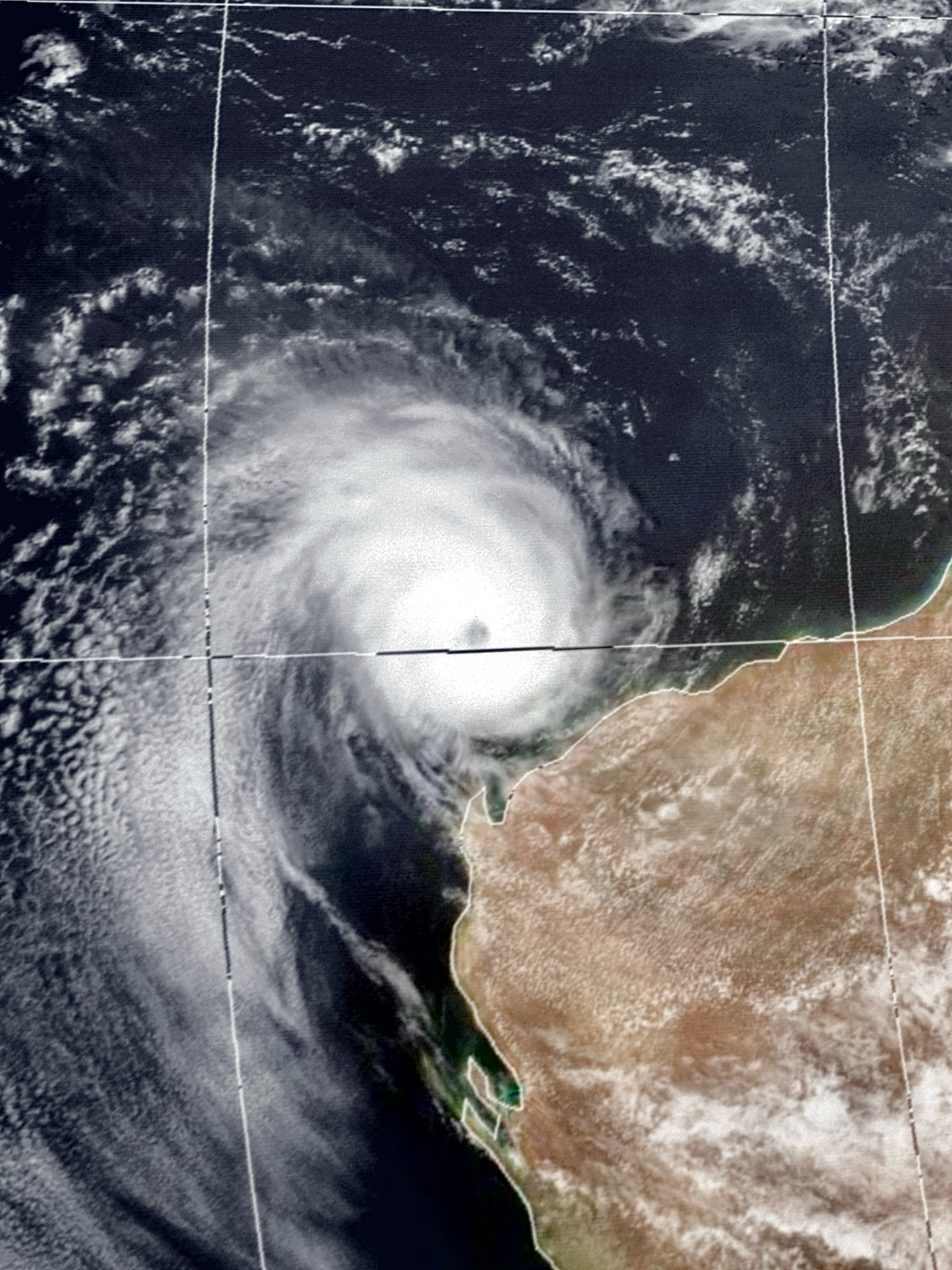
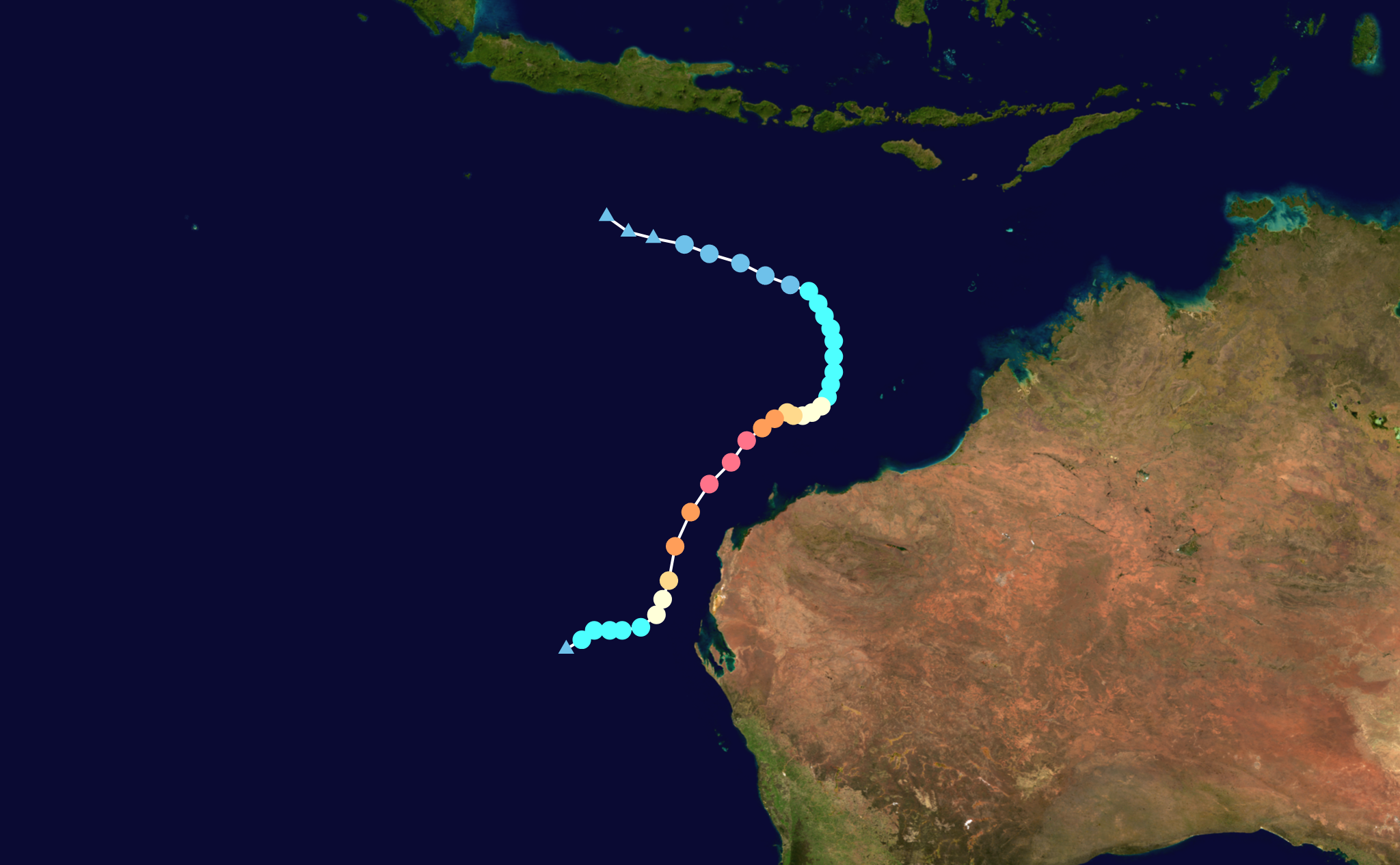
- Duration: 12 January – 21 January
- Peak intensity: 205 km/h (125 mph) (10-min); 930 hPa (mbar)

=== Tropical Cyclone Eddie ===
- Category 2 tropical cyclone (Australian scale)
- Tropical storm (SSHWS)
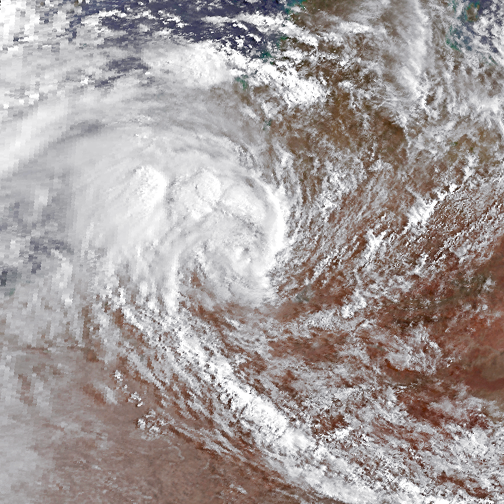
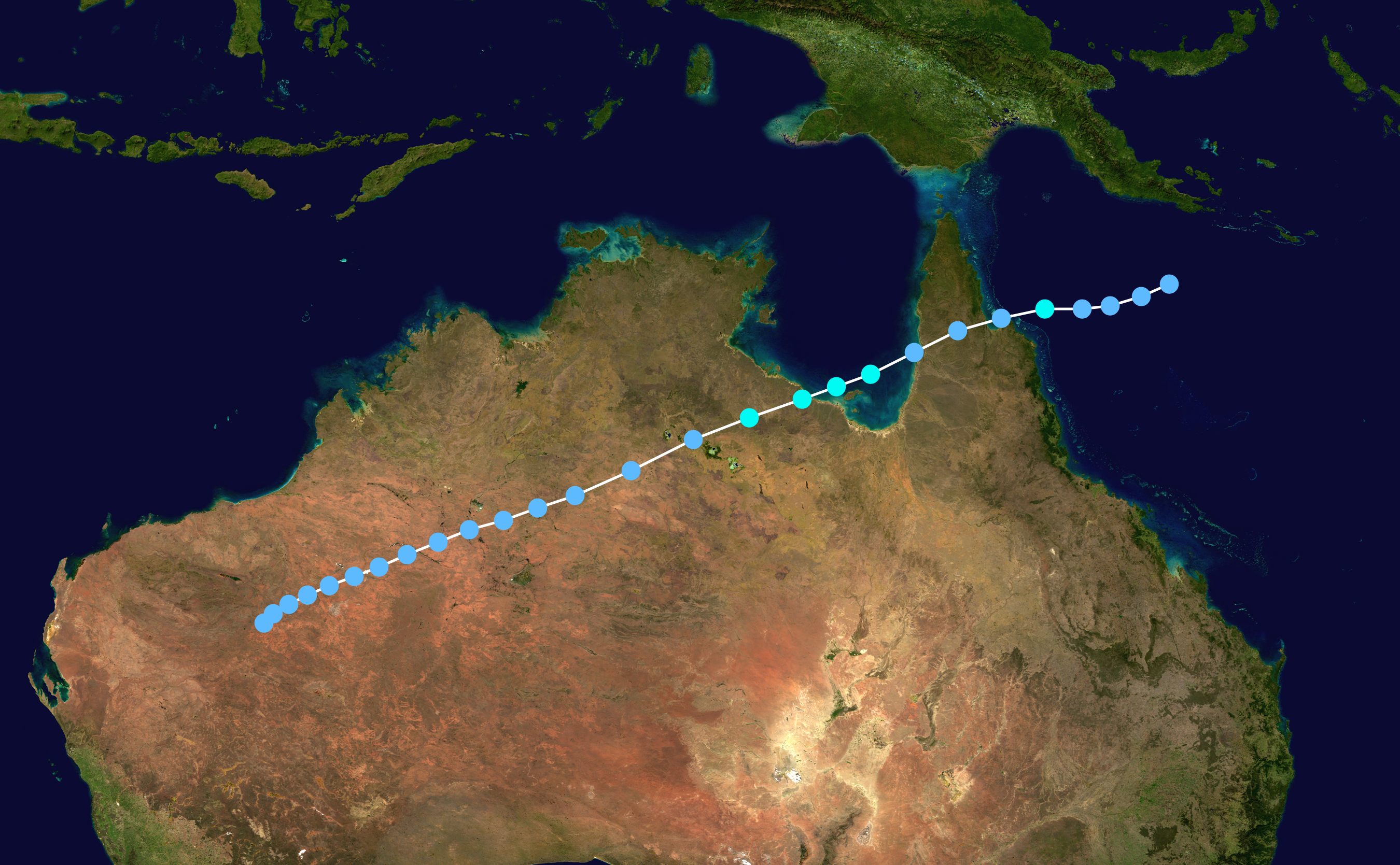
- Duration: 8 February – 13 February
- Peak intensity: 100 km/h (65 mph) (10-min); 980 hPa (mbar)

=== Tropical Cyclone Cliff ===
- Category 2 tropical cyclone (Australian scale)
- Tropical storm (SSHWS)
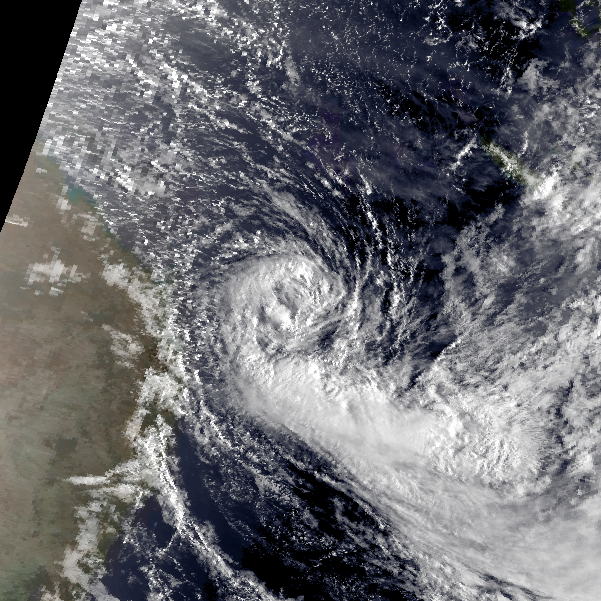
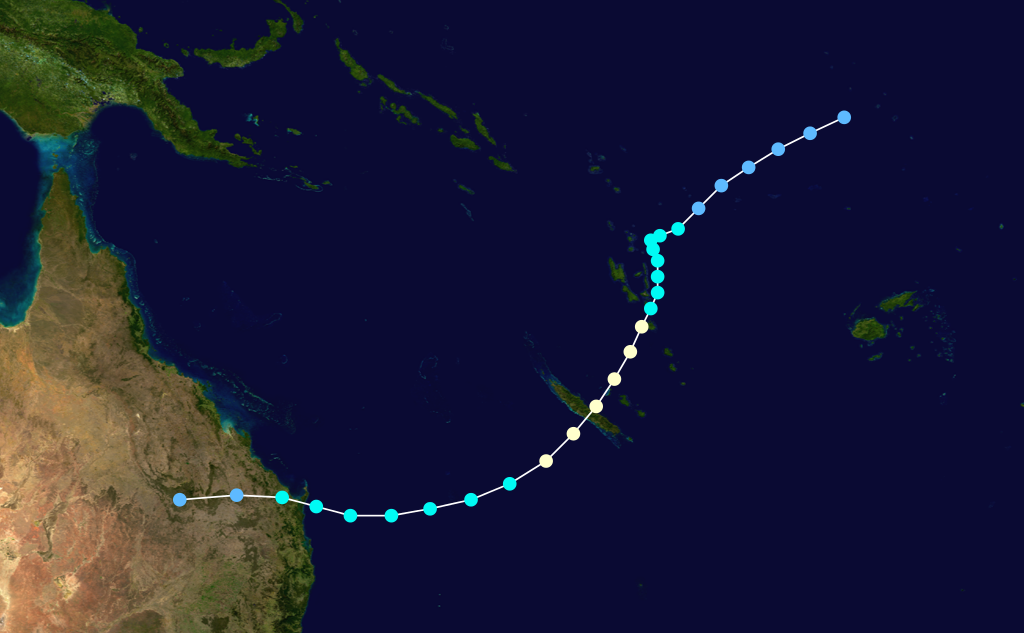
- Duration: 13 February (Crossed 160°E) – 15 February
- Peak intensity: 95 km/h (60 mph) (10-min); 980 hPa (mbar)

Initially a South Pacific tropical cyclone, Cliff developed on February 9, near Vanua Lava, Vanuatu. The cyclone reached peak intensity on February 12, with an estimated central pressure of 975 hPa. It passed over New Caledonia at near peak intensity, with sustained winds 92 km/h (57 mph). After crossing into the Australian region, Cliff struck Queensland on February 14, making landfall near Bundaberg. The cyclone caused some crop and structural damages in South East Queensland, and beach erosion occurred on the Gold and Sunshine coasts. One man was drowned off the Gold Coast.

=== Severe Tropical Cyclone Neil ===
- Category 4 severe tropical cyclone (Australian scale)
- Category 3 tropical cyclone (SSHWS)
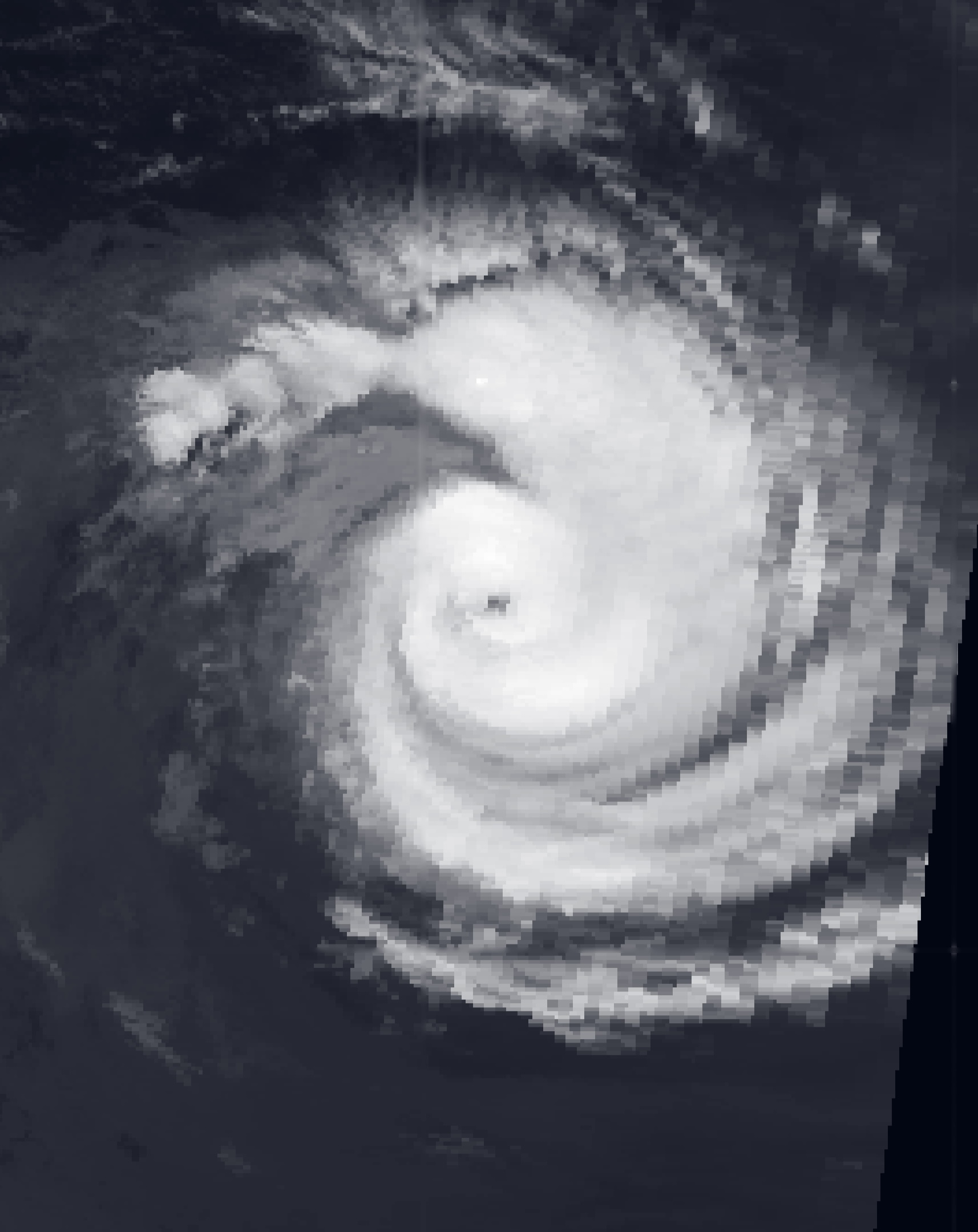
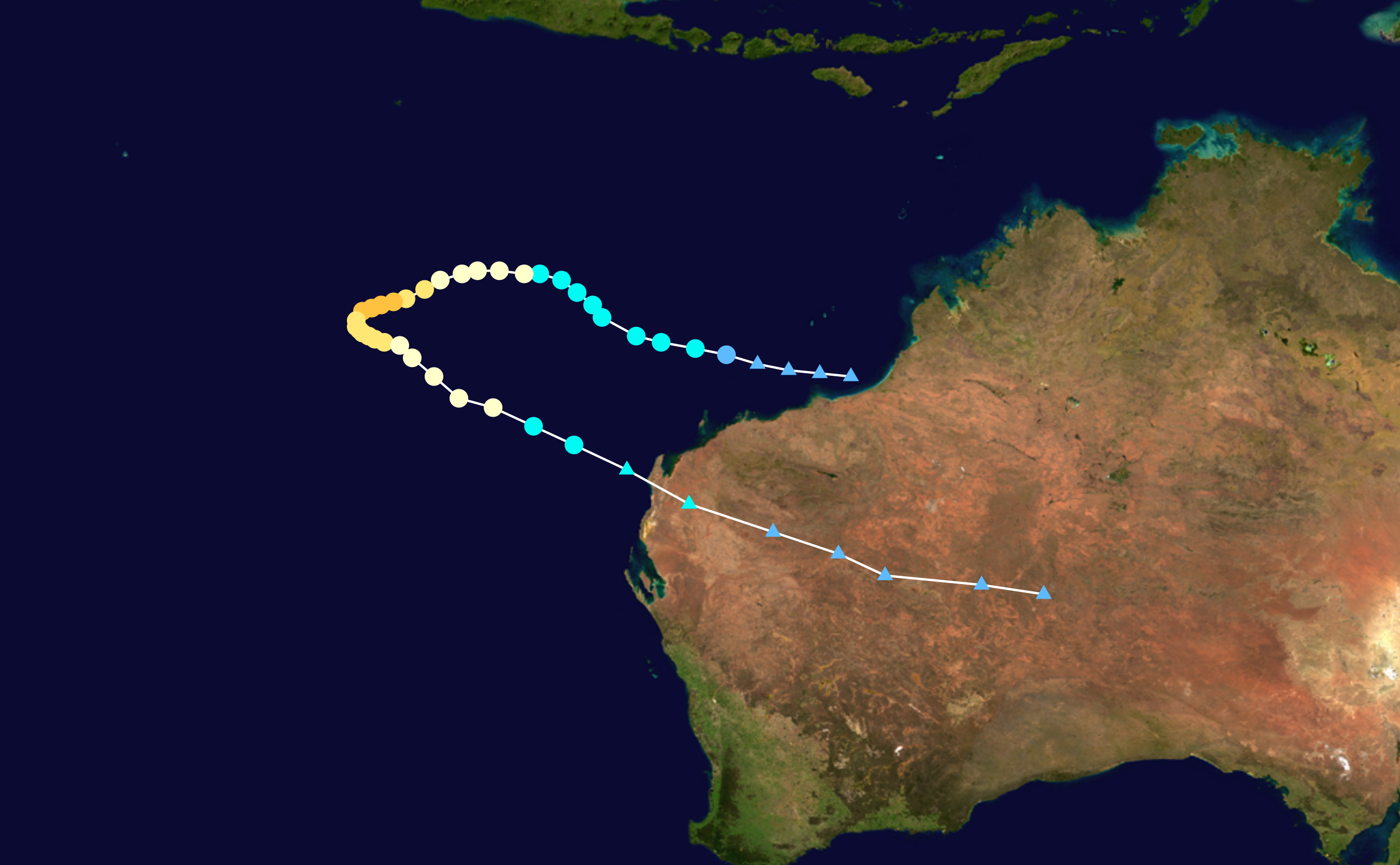
- Duration: 24 February – 7 March
- Peak intensity: 195 km/h (120 mph) (10-min); 940 hPa (mbar)

=== Severe Tropical Cyclone Freda ===
- Category 3 severe tropical cyclone (Australian scale)
- Tropical storm (SSHWS)
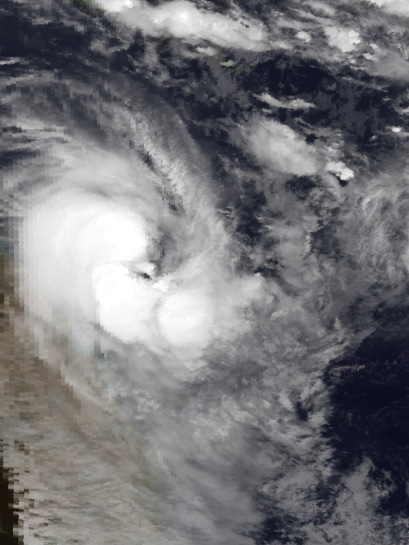
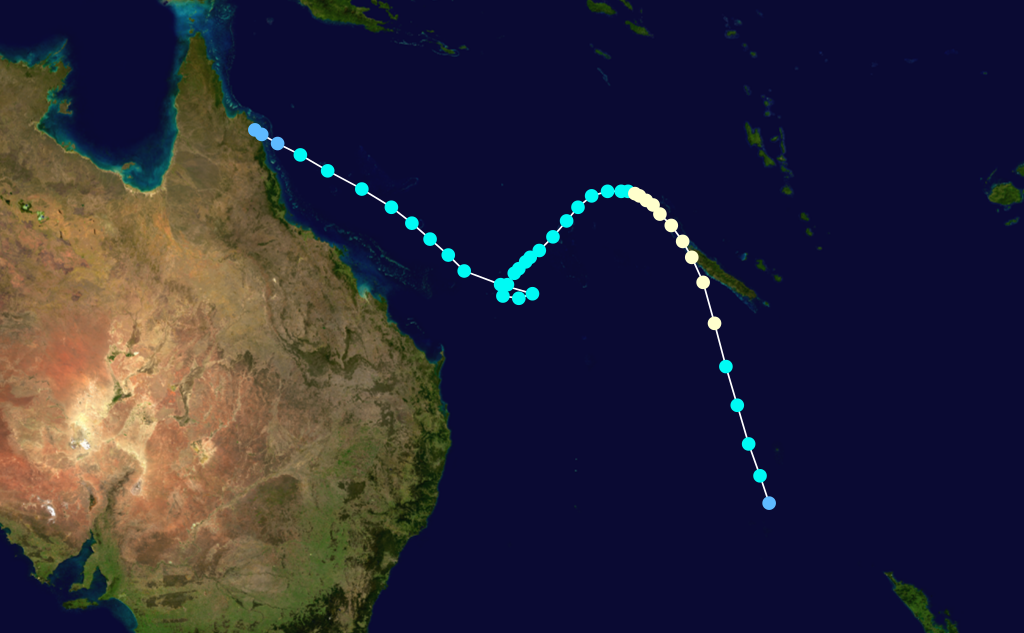
- Duration: 24 February – 3 March (Crossed 160°E)
- Peak intensity: 130 km/h (80 mph) (10-min); 972 hPa (mbar)

=== Severe Tropical Cyclone Max ===
- Category 3 severe tropical cyclone (Australian scale)
- Category 3 tropical cyclone (SSHWS)
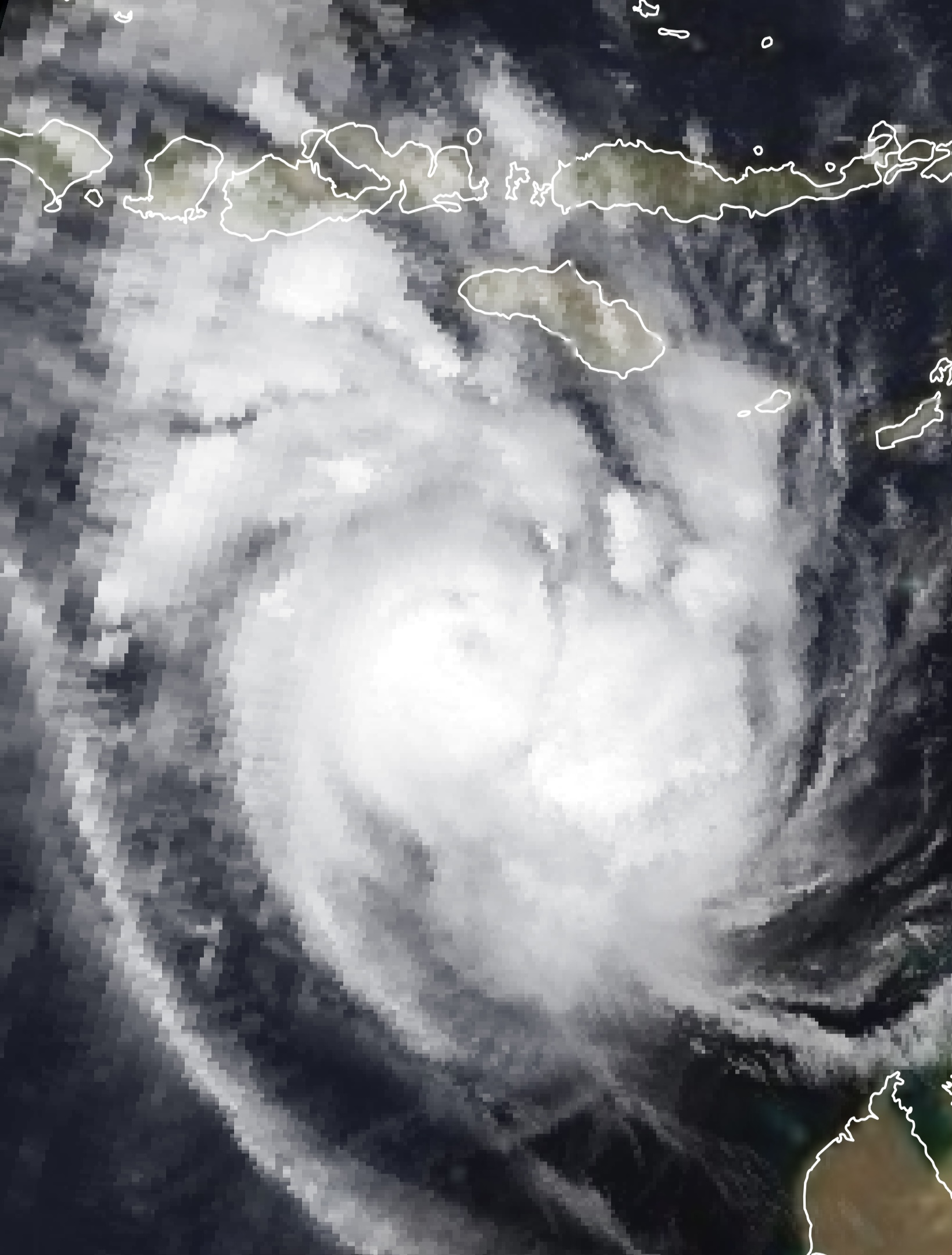
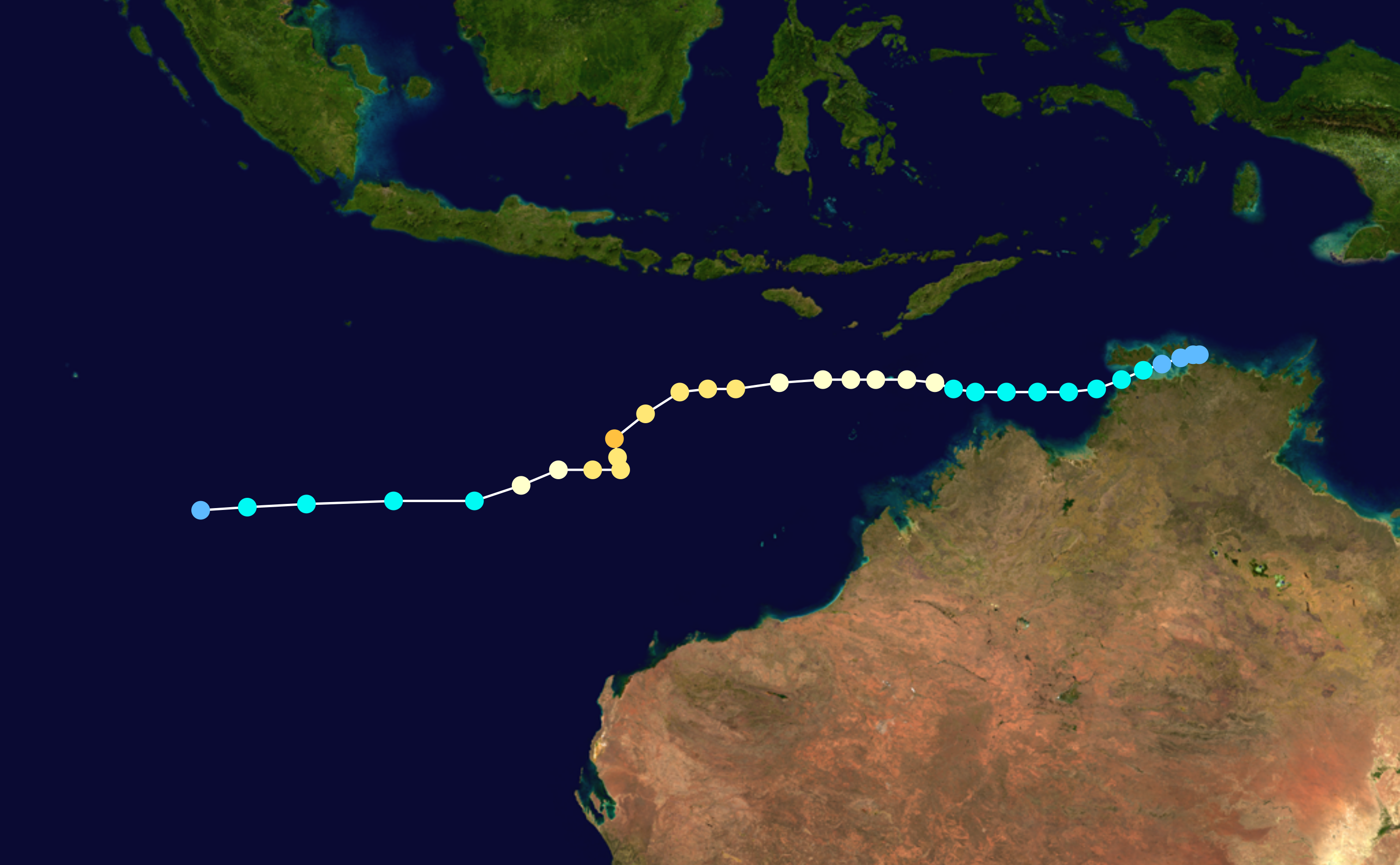
- Duration: 9 March – 19 March
- Peak intensity: 155 km/h (100 mph) (10-min); 960 hPa (mbar)

Cyclone Max developed from a low-pressure system into a Category 1 cyclone in Van Diemen Gulf, off the Northern Territory Coast, on 11 March 1981. Moving west-southwest, it crossed over Darwin, Australia later that day, causing tree damage and flooding but minimal structural damage. It subsequently moved west into the Timor Sea and the Indian Ocean, and although intensifying to Category 3 and reaching a lowest pressure of 960.0 hectopascals (28.35 inHg), did not approach land again. Max was notable for being the first cyclone to pass over Darwin since the city was destroyed by Cyclone Tracy 6 years earlier. The name Max was not retired from the Northern Australia naming list.

=== Severe Tropical Cyclone Olga ===
- Category 4 severe tropical cyclone (Australian scale)
- Category 4 tropical cyclone (SSHWS)
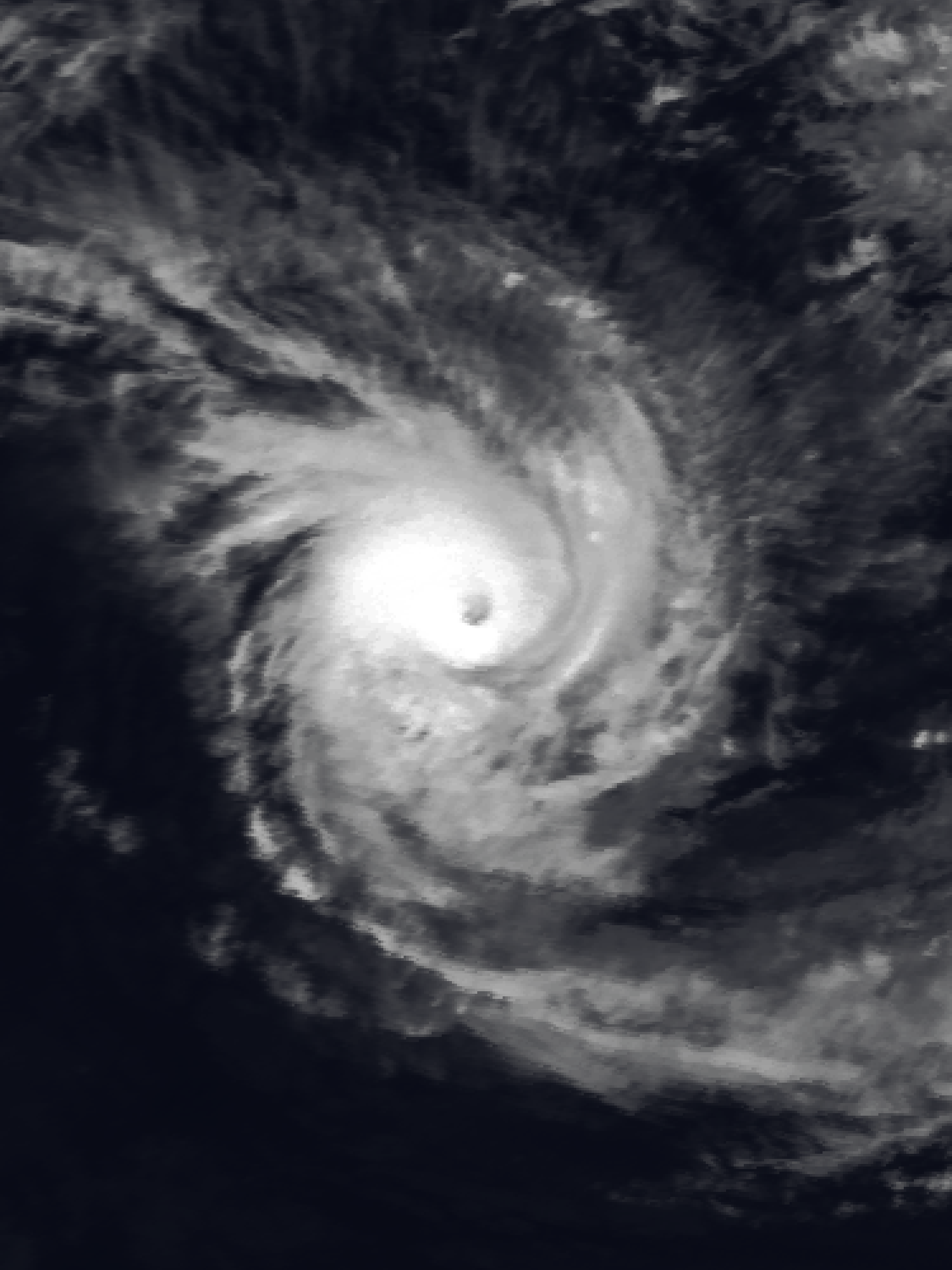
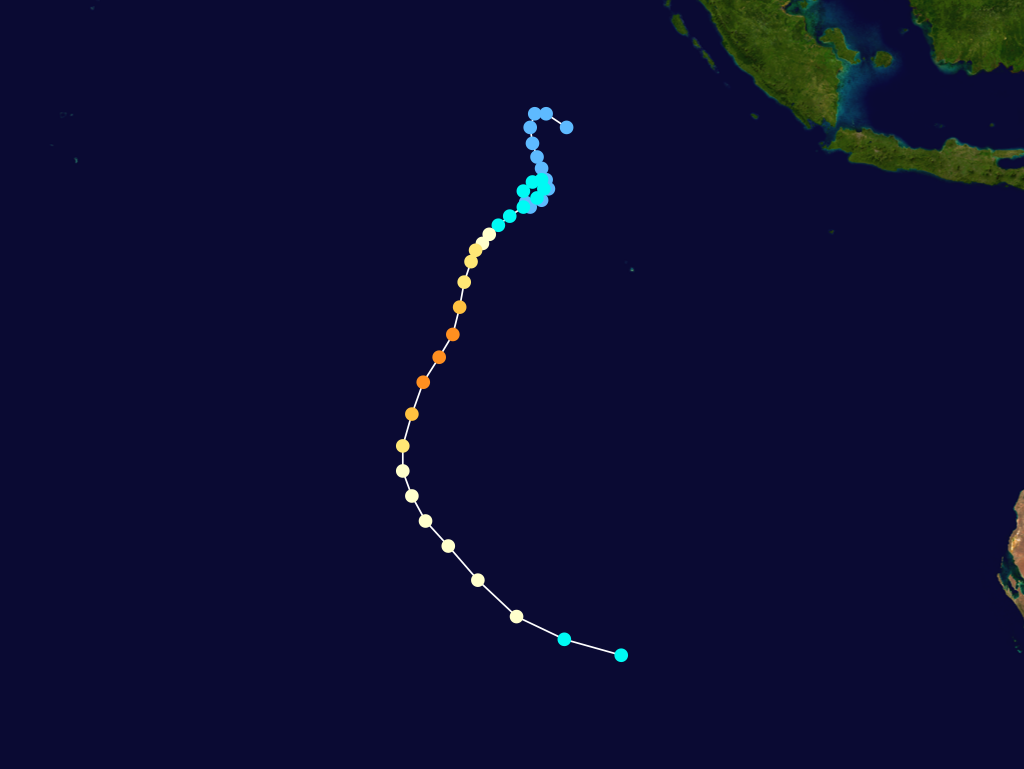
- Duration: 5 April – 15 April
- Peak intensity: 175 km/h (110 mph) (10-min); 940 hPa (mbar)

=== Severe Tropical Cyclone Paddy ===
- Category 3 severe tropical cyclone (Australian scale)
- Tropical storm (SSHWS)
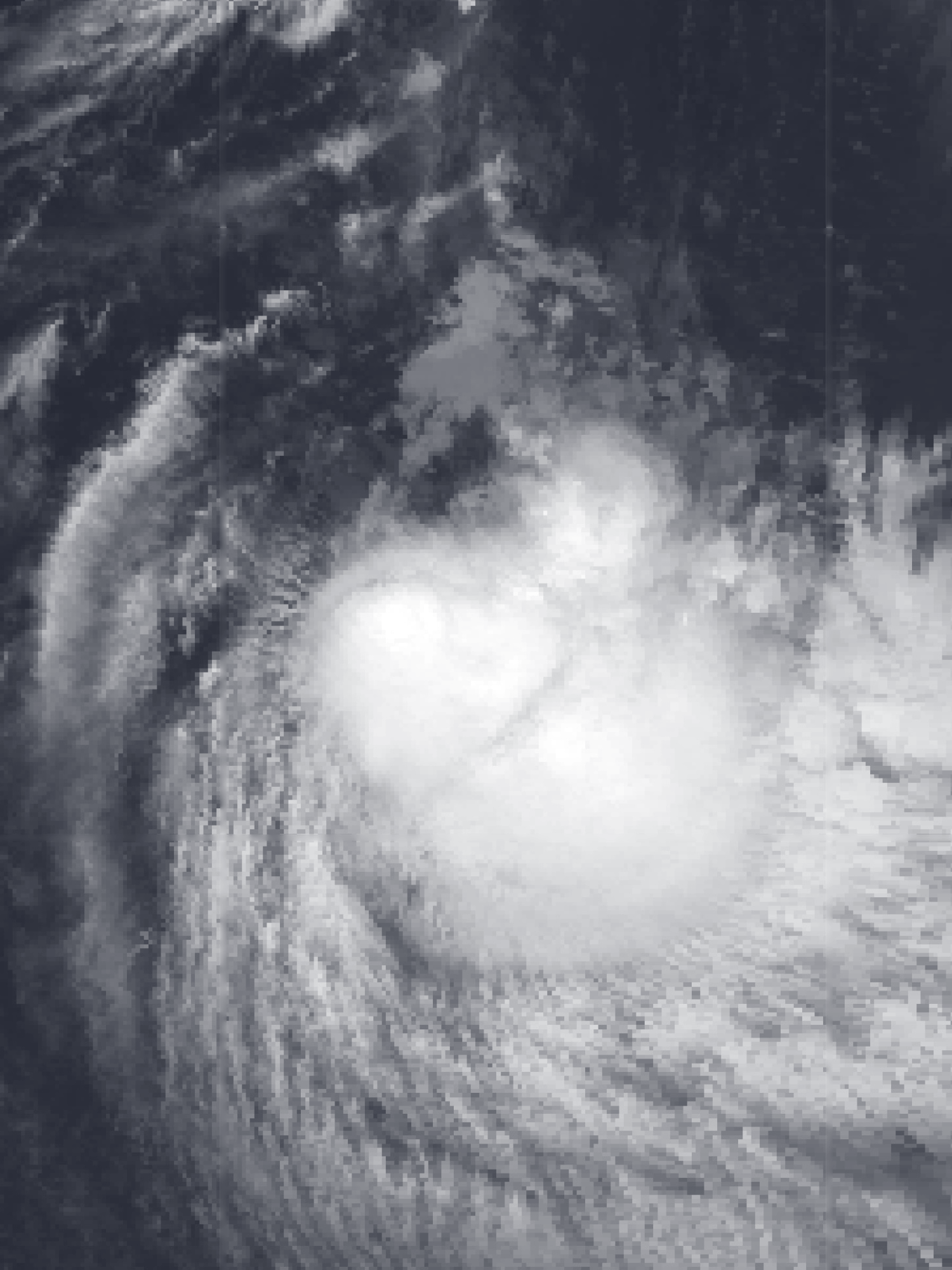
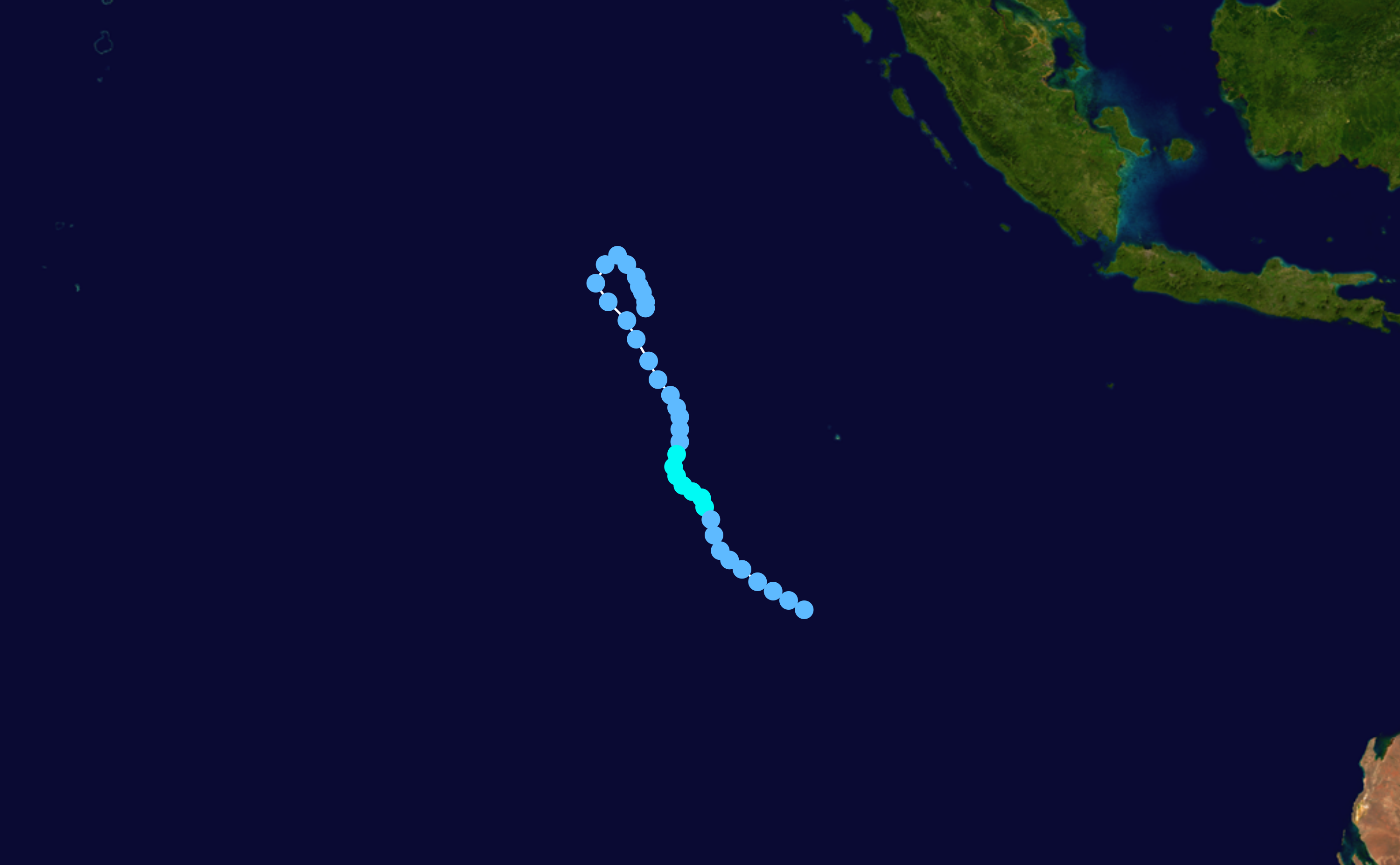
- Duration: 24 May – 30 May
- Peak intensity: 120 km/h (75 mph) (10-min); 973 hPa (mbar)

== See also ==
- Atlantic hurricane seasons: 1980, 1981
- Eastern Pacific hurricane seasons: 1980, 1981
- Western Pacific typhoon seasons: 1980, 1981
- North Indian Ocean cyclone seasons: 1980, 1981
