= 1980–81 South-West Indian Ocean cyclone season =

Cyclone season in the Southwest Indian Ocean

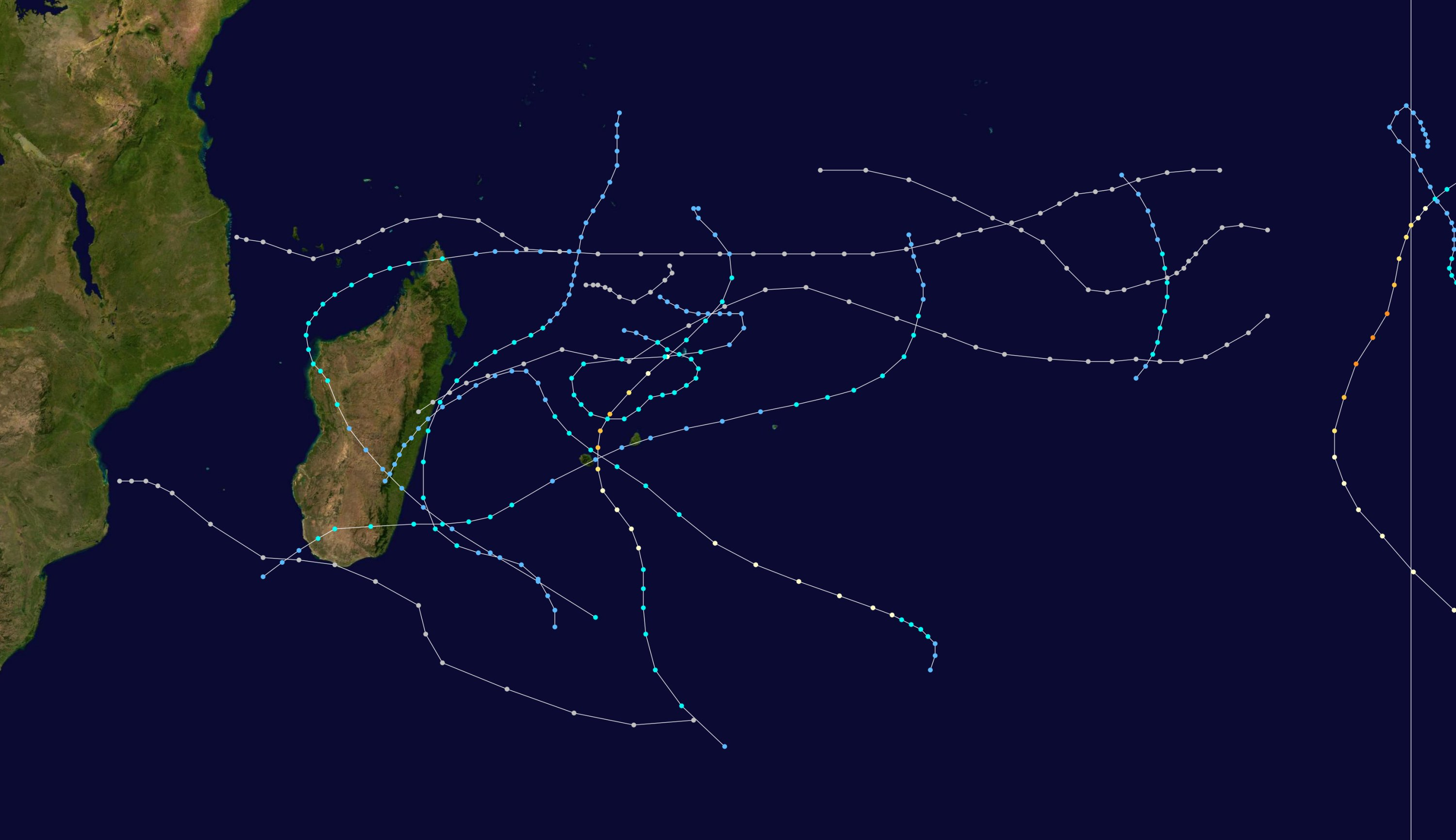
- Season summary map

Seasonal boundaries
- First system formed: November 8, 1980
- Last system dissipated: May 4, 1981

Strongest storm
- Name: Florine
  - Maximum winds: 225 km/h (140 mph) (10-minute sustained)
  - Lowest pressure: 935 hPa (mbar)

Seasonal statistics
- Total depressions: 12
- Total storms: 12
- Tropical cyclones: 3
- Intense tropical cyclones: 2
- Total fatalities: Unknown
- Total damage: Unknown

Related articles
- 1980–81 Australian region cyclone season; 1980–81 South Pacific cyclone season

The 1980–81 South-West Indian Ocean cyclone season was an average cyclone season.

== Systems ==
=== Tropical Cyclone Alice–Adelaide ===
- Tropical cyclone (MFR)
- Tropical storm (SSHWS)
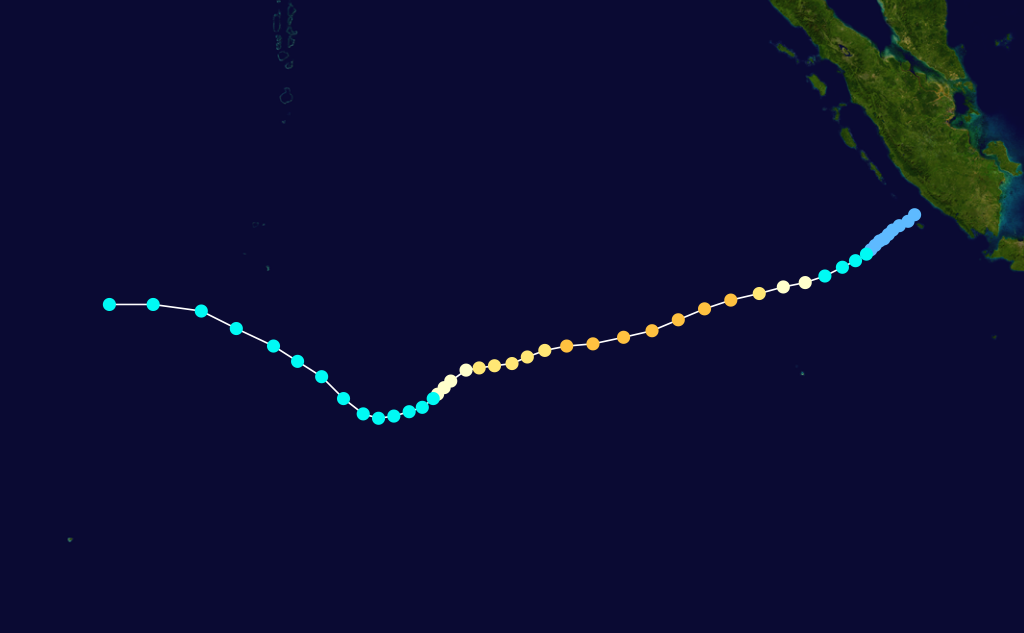
- Duration: November 10 (Entered basin) – November 14
- Peak intensity: 120 km/h (75 mph) (10-min);

On November 3, a low-pressure area developed off the southwest coast of Sumatra in the Australian basin. The BoM upgraded the low to Tropical Cyclone Alice two days later, which was intensifying while moving west-southwestward, steered by the subtropical ridge to its south. Alice attained a peak intensity of 180 km/h (110 mph) in the Australian basin on November 7. While in the region, the cyclone's high waves capsized two boats. The crew of the Sing Long No. 21 escaped in two life rafts; a freighter rescued one raft, but the other was lost, with 12 crew members aboard.

Cyclone Alice crossed 90º E on November 9, and 85º E a day later, whereupon the MMS renamed the storm as Adelaide, estimating winds of at least 120 km/h (75 mph). The JTWC estimated maximum sustained winds of 205 km/h (127 mph) at that time. Adelaide soon began a weakening trend, falling below tropical cyclone status on November 11. A day later, the storm turned to the west-northwest, steered by a ridge to the south. Adelaide weakened to a tropical depression on November 13, and was no longer classifiable a tropical cyclone by a day later.

=== Moderate Tropical Storm Bettina ===
- Moderate tropical storm (MFR)
- Tropical storm (SSHWS)
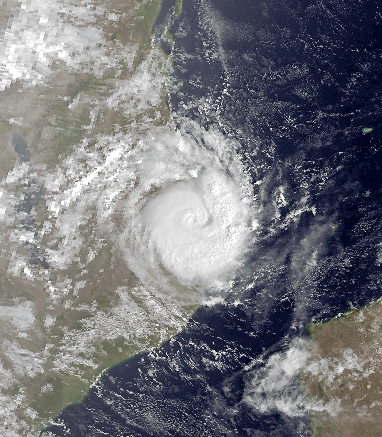
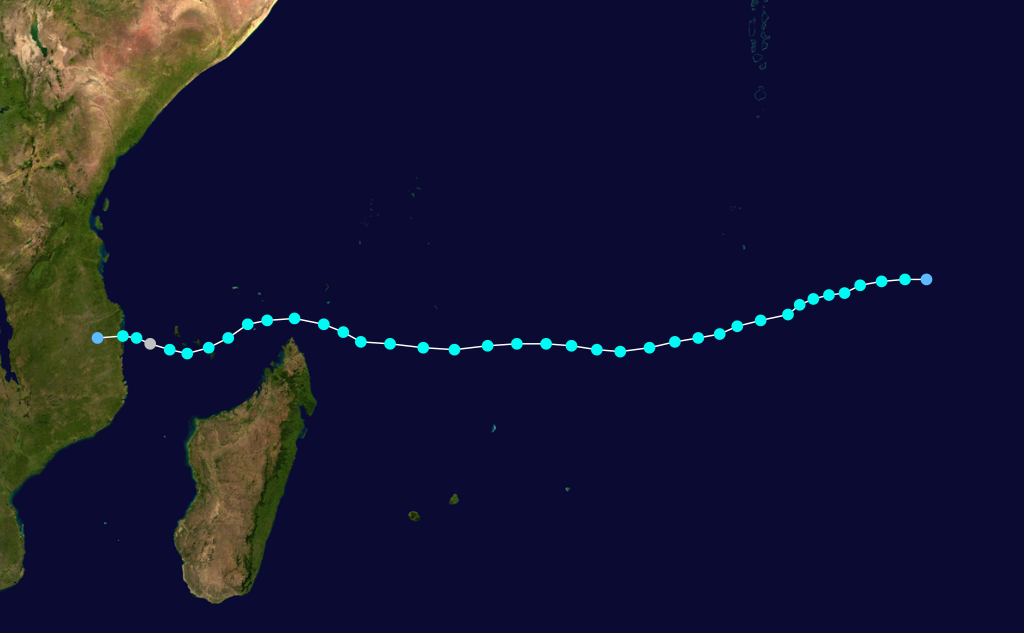
- Duration: November 22 – December 1
- Peak intensity: 85 km/h (50 mph) (10-min);

Bettina formed on November 22, over the central Indian Ocean. It moved south-southwestward and reached a peak intensity of 50 knots (58 mph; 93 km/h) on November 26. It made landfall as a tropical storm over Mozambique and weakened shortly after on December 1.

=== Tropical Cyclone Bert–Christelle ===
- Tropical cyclone (MFR)
- Category 1 tropical cyclone (SSHWS)
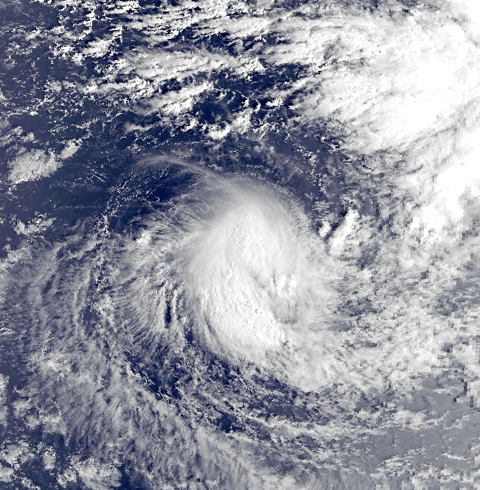
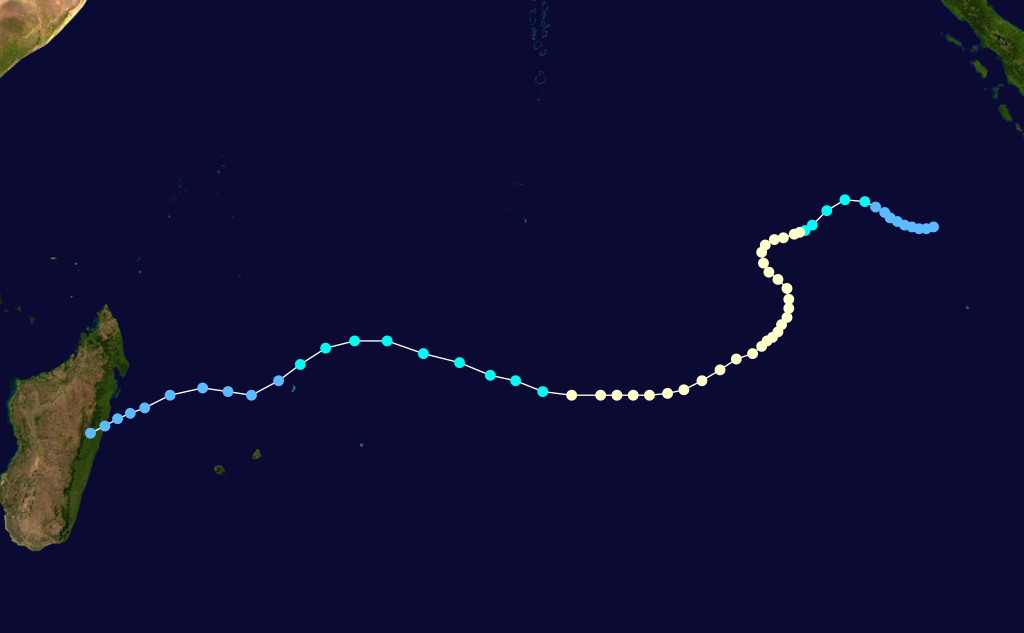
- Duration: December 3 (Entered basin) – December 9
- Peak intensity: 140 km/h (85 mph) (10-min); 965 hPa (mbar)

Formed on November 24 over the open Indian Ocean it moved in a mostly southwest direction, though it did curve a few times. It reached a peak intensity of 80 knots (92 mph; 150 km/h) and a pressure of 965 hectopascals (28.50 inHg) on November 29. Christelle made landfall on Madagascar on December 9 as a tropical depression.

=== Moderate Tropical Storm Diana ===
- Moderate tropical storm (MFR)
- Tropical storm (SSHWS)
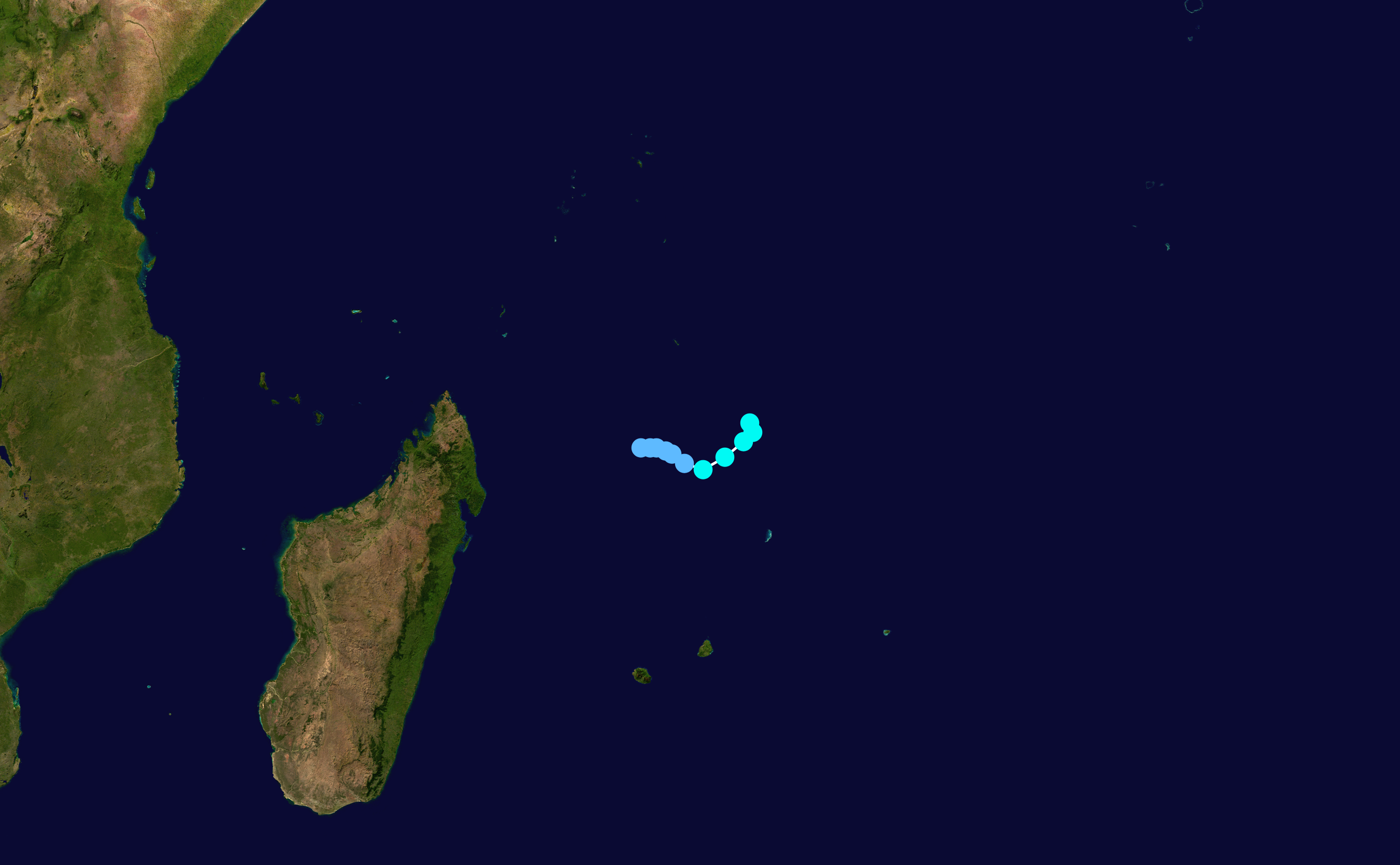
- Duration: December 17 – December 19
- Peak intensity: 65 km/h (40 mph) (10-min);

Diana existed from December 17 to December 19.

=== Moderate Tropical Storm Edwige ===
- Moderate tropical storm (MFR)
- Tropical storm (SSHWS)
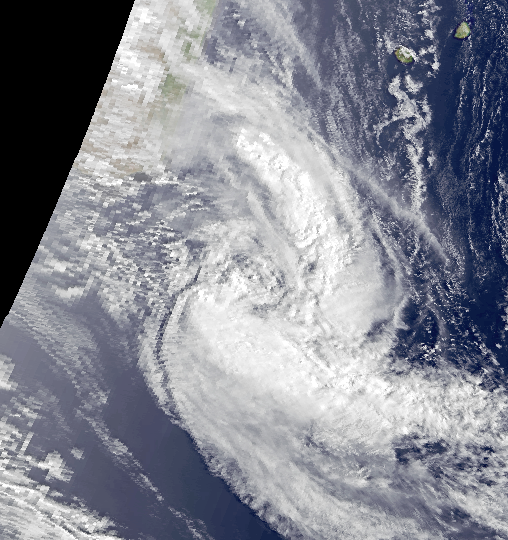
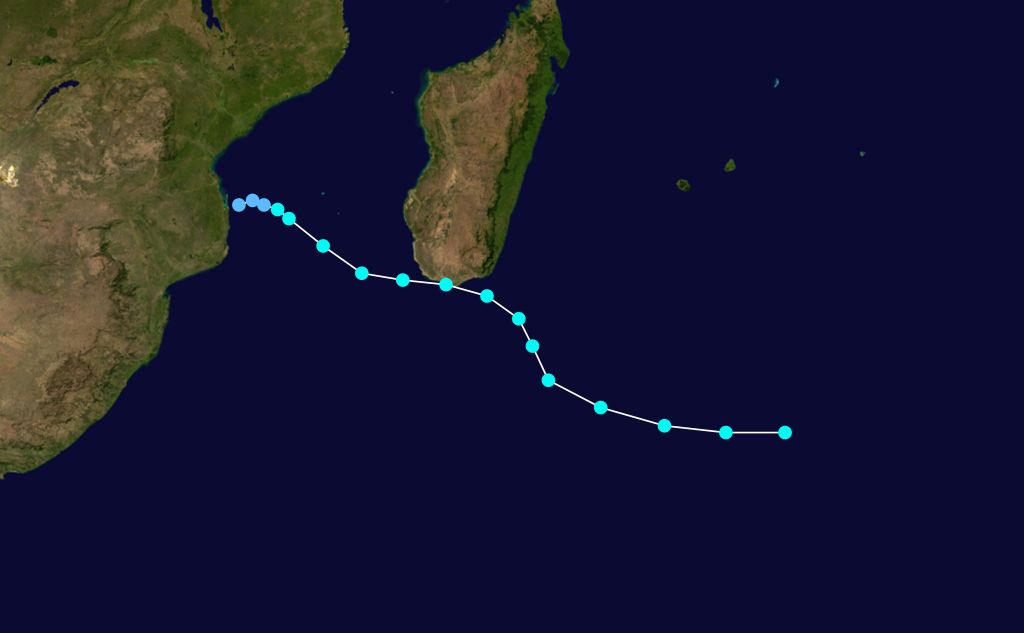
- Duration: December 28 – January 1
- Peak intensity: 65 km/h (40 mph) (10-min);

Edwige brushed Madagascar.

=== Very Intense Tropical Cyclone Florine ===
- Very intense tropical cyclone (MFR)
- Category 3 tropical cyclone (SSHWS)
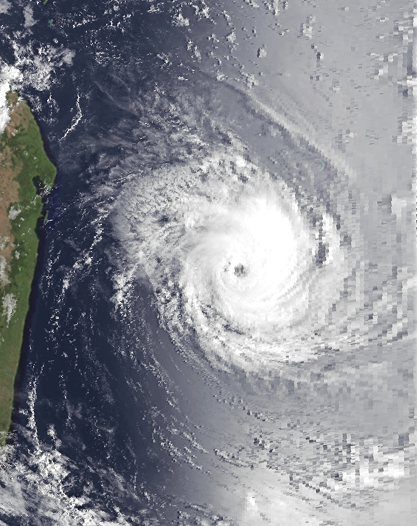
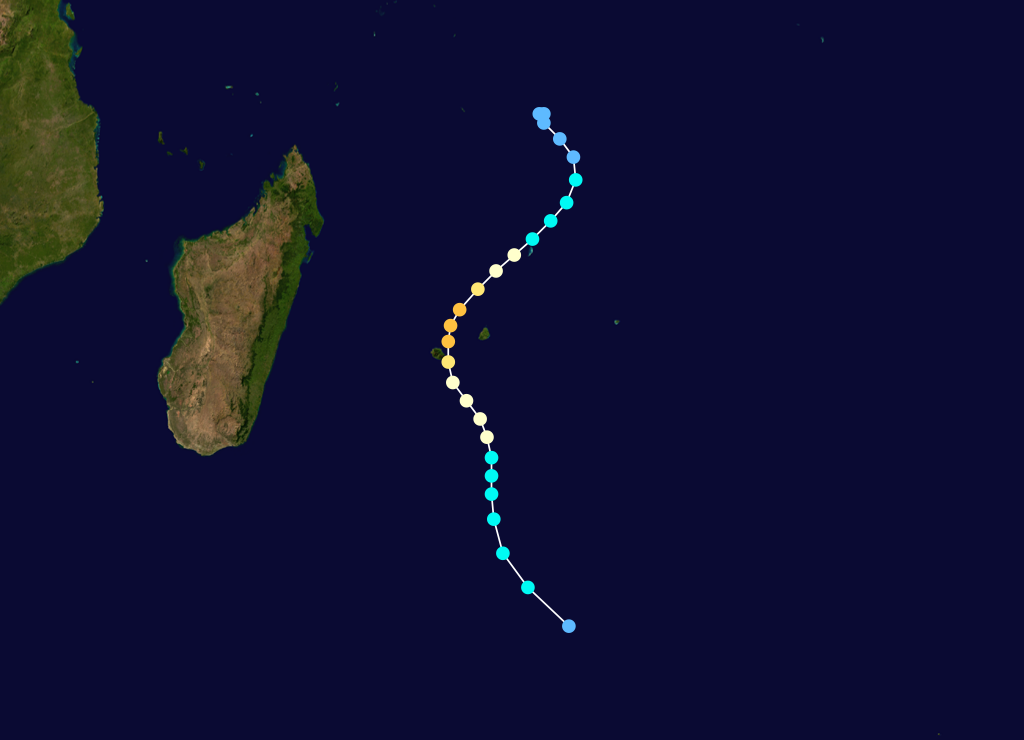
- Duration: January 3 – January 11
- Peak intensity: 220 km/h (140 mph) (10-min); 935 hPa (mbar)

Toward the beginning of January, the ITCZ was active to the northeast of Madagascar, spawning a circulation east of Agalega that became a depression on January 3. On the next day, the system was named Florine. Steered between a ridge to its northwest and northeast, the system moved erratically until January 5, when Florine began a steady movement to the south and later southwest. The change in trajectory was because the ridge to Florine's northeast had weakened. On January 6, the intensifying storm passed just west of St. Brandon, where a station recorded sustained winds of 115 km/h (71 mph) and gusts of 148 km/h (92 mph). A day later, the outer eyewall of Florine moved across Réunion island, while the center of the eye passed 25 km east of Sainte-Rose. Roland Garros Airport recorded a minimum pressure of 935 mbar (27.6 inHg), the lowest on the island. A landfall was spared due to a shift in trajectory to the south-southeast caused by a passing cold front. Also around this time, the cyclone reached its peak intensity according to the JTWC; the agency estimated peak winds of 195 km/h (121 mph), based on a Dvorak rating of 5.5. The MFR estimated peak 10 minute winds of 220 km/h (140 mph). Florine weakened as it accelerated ahead of a polar trough, and was no classifiable as a tropical cyclone on January 10. The remnants passed west of Île Amsterdam on the next day and continued southeastward.

Florine's close passage to Réunion caused injuries to two people. The high winds, peaking at 234 km/h (145 mph) at Plaine des Cafres, affected the island alongside heavy rainfall. Precipitation totals ranged from 100 mm (3.9 in) near the coast to 1,161 mm (45.7 in) at Foc-Foc. High tides reached 5.2 m (17 ft) at the coast in La Possession. Cyclone Florine destroyed crops and 95 houses. It caused injuries to two people and left around 500 people homeless. The storm knocked down 2000 phone lines and caused disruptions to the power network. Cilaos and Salazie became isolated during the storm, requiring assistance by helicopter. In nearby Mauritius, winds peaked at 137 km/h (85 mph).

=== Moderate Tropical Storm Gaelle ===
- Moderate tropical storm (MFR)
- Tropical storm (SSHWS)
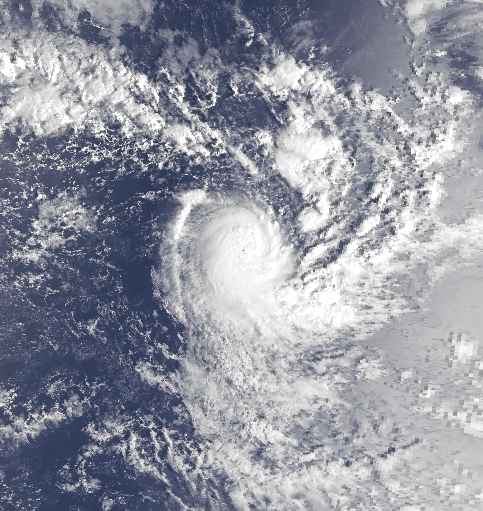
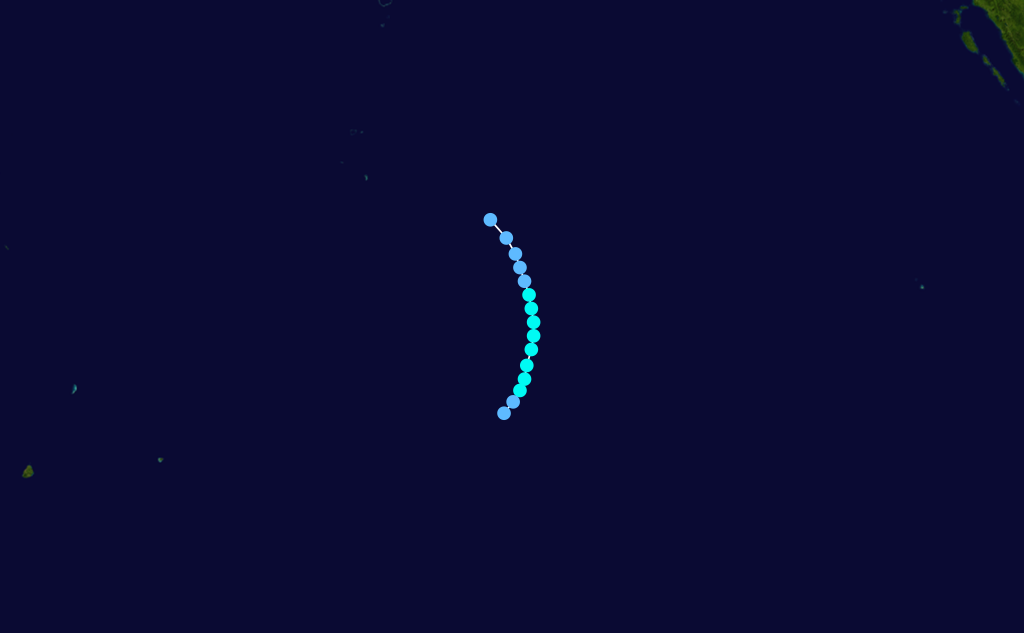
- Duration: January 14 – January 18
- Peak intensity: 75 km/h (45 mph) (10-min);

Gaelle existed from January 14 to January 18.

=== Moderate Tropical Storm Helyette ===
- Moderate tropical storm (MFR)
- Tropical storm (SSHWS)
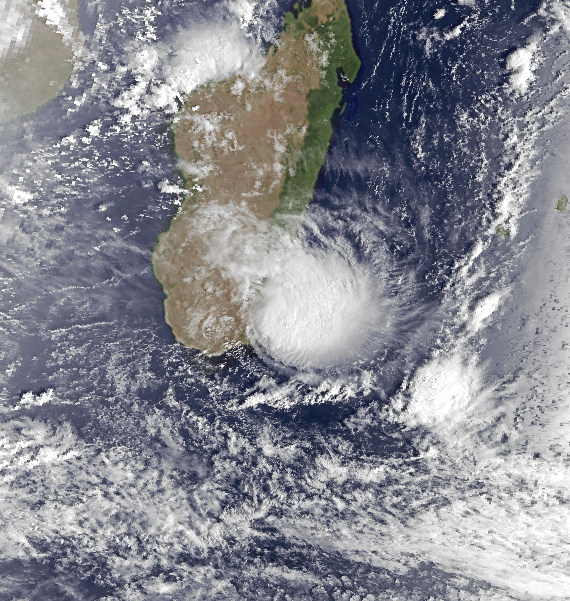
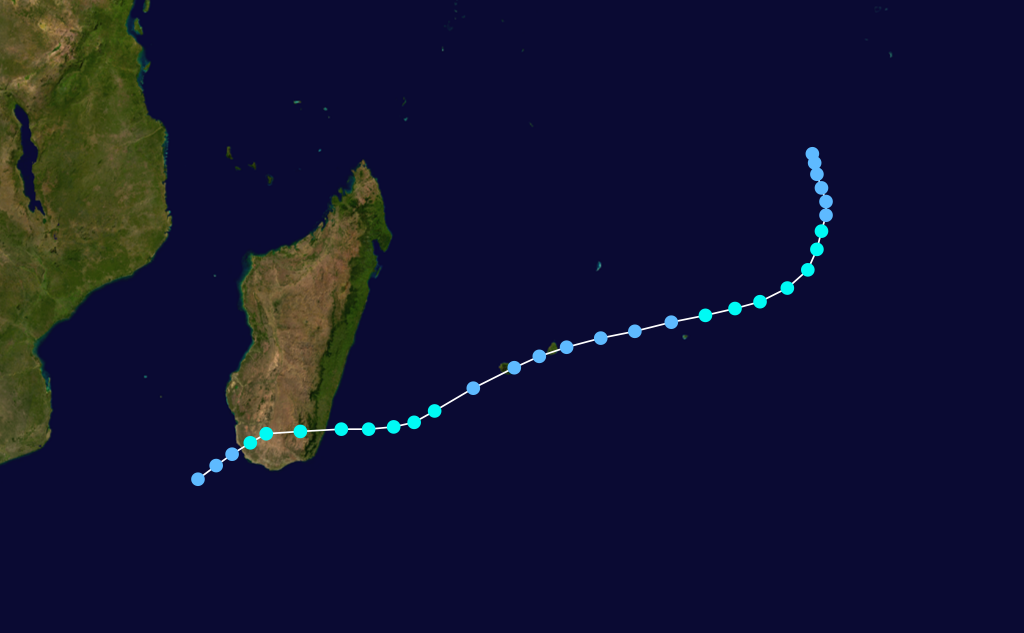
- Duration: January 28 – February 6
- Peak intensity: 75 km/h (45 mph) (10-min);

On January 31, Tropical Depression Helyette passed north of Rodrigues, and the next day moved over Mauritius and just southeast of Réunion. The highest wind gust was 121 km/h (75 mph) at Fort William on Mauritius. Helyette made landfall in Madagascar.

=== Severe Tropical Storm Iadine ===
- Severe tropical storm (MFR)
- Tropical storm (SSHWS)
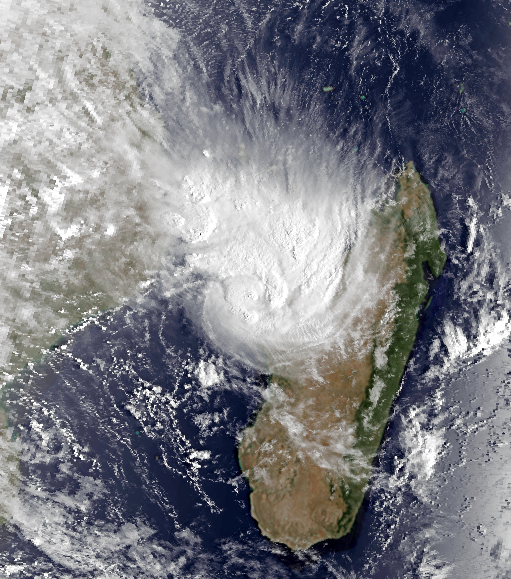
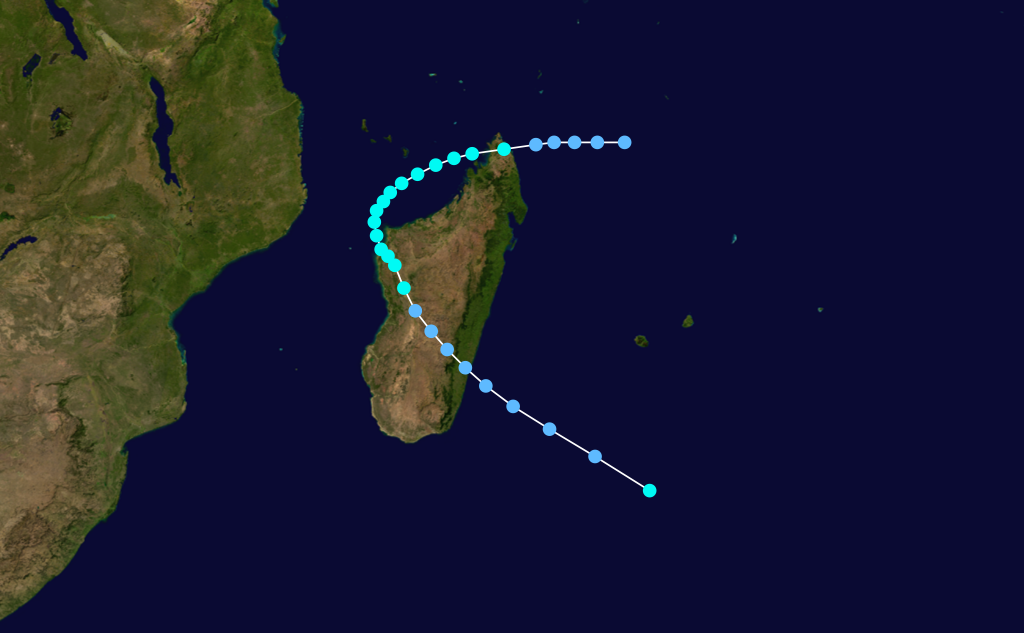
- Duration: February 16 – February 25
- Peak intensity: 95 km/h (60 mph) (10-min);

Iadine also made landfall in Madagascar.

=== Severe Tropical Storm Johanne ===
- Severe tropical storm (MFR)
- Category 1 tropical cyclone (SSHWS)
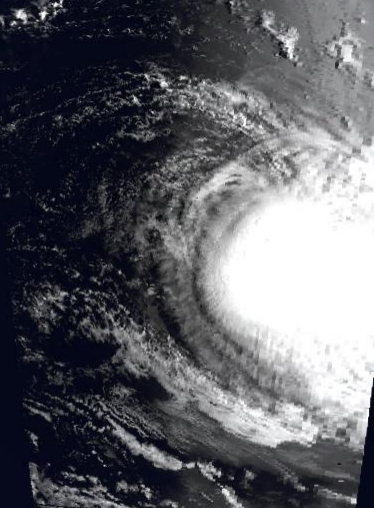
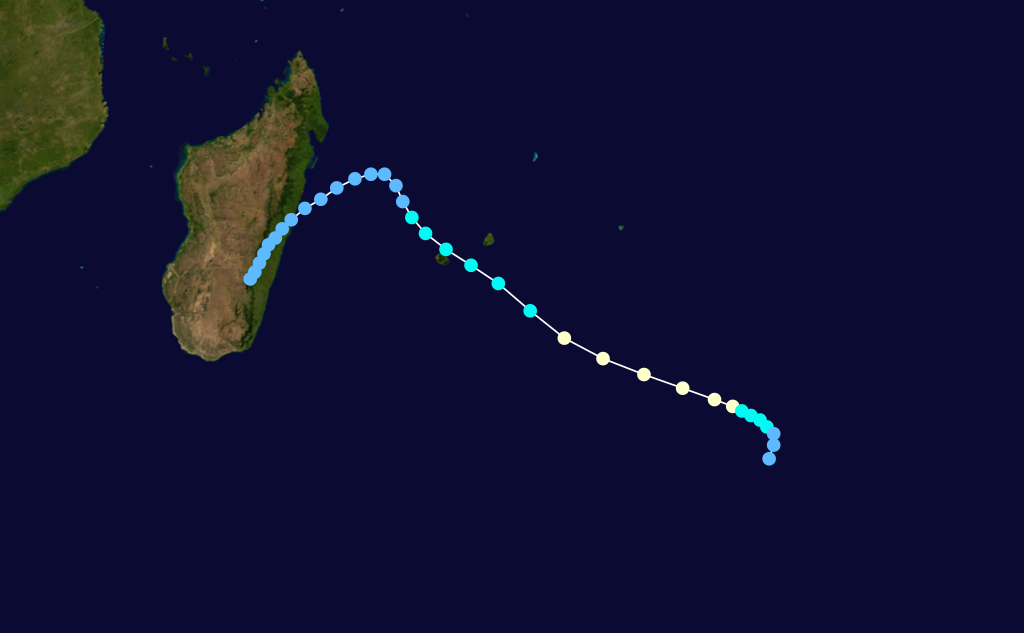
- Duration: March 1 – March 11
- Peak intensity: 110 km/h (70 mph) (10-min);

Johanne existed from March 1 to March 11. On March 6, Tropical Storm Johanne passed between Réunion and Mauritius while passing southeastward, with respective island rainfall totals of 316 and 260 mm (12.4 and 10.2 in). The highest wind gust was 124 km/h (77 mph) at Mon Desert Alma on Mauritius.

=== Moderate Tropical Storm Klara ===
- Moderate tropical storm (MFR)
- Tropical storm (SSHWS)
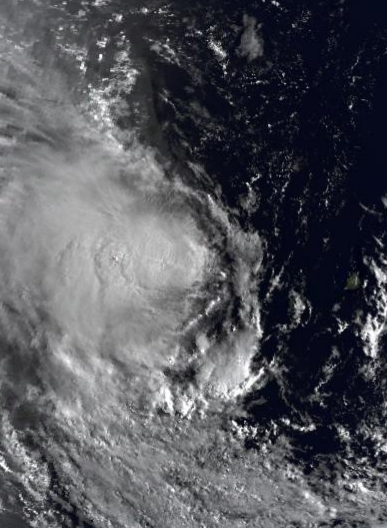
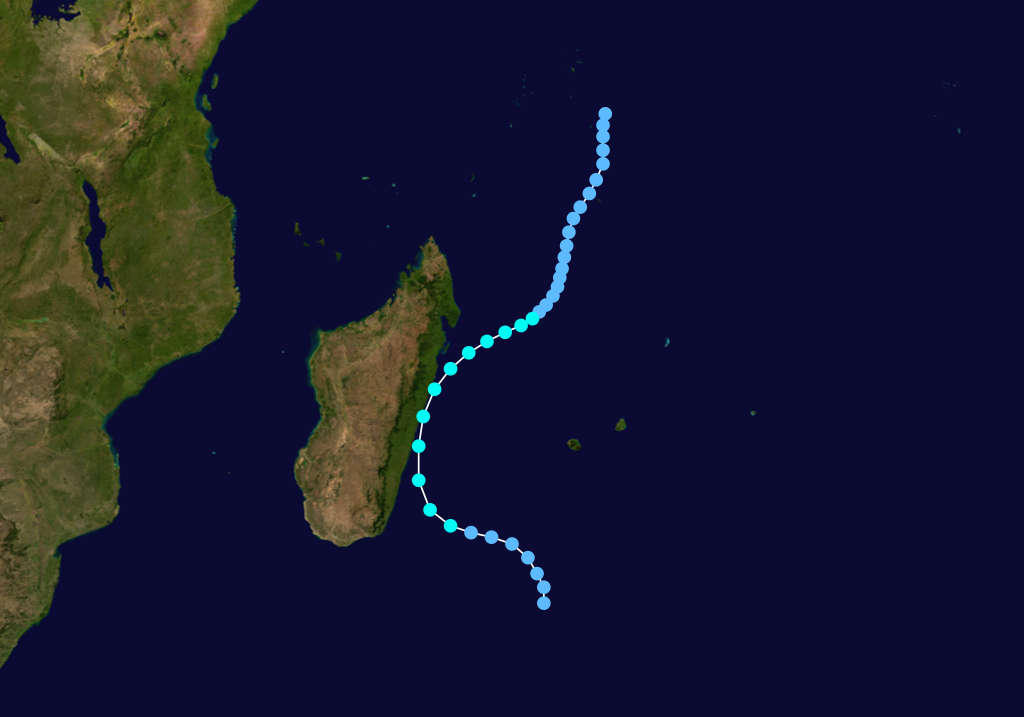
- Duration: March 28 – April 8
- Peak intensity: 75 km/h (45 mph) (10-min);

Klara existed from March 28 to April 8.

=== Moderate Tropical Storm Lisa ===
- Moderate tropical storm (MFR)
- Tropical storm (SSHWS)
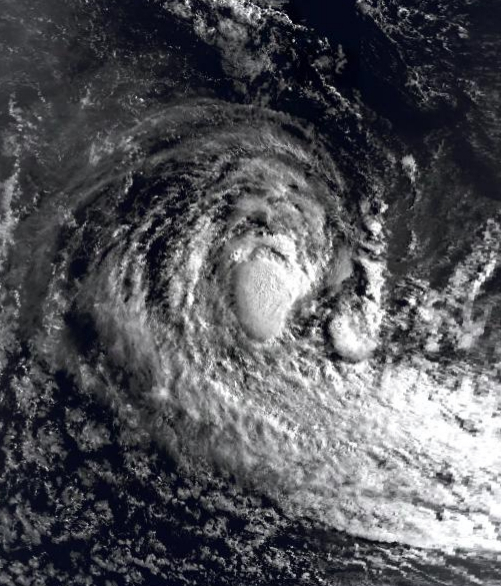
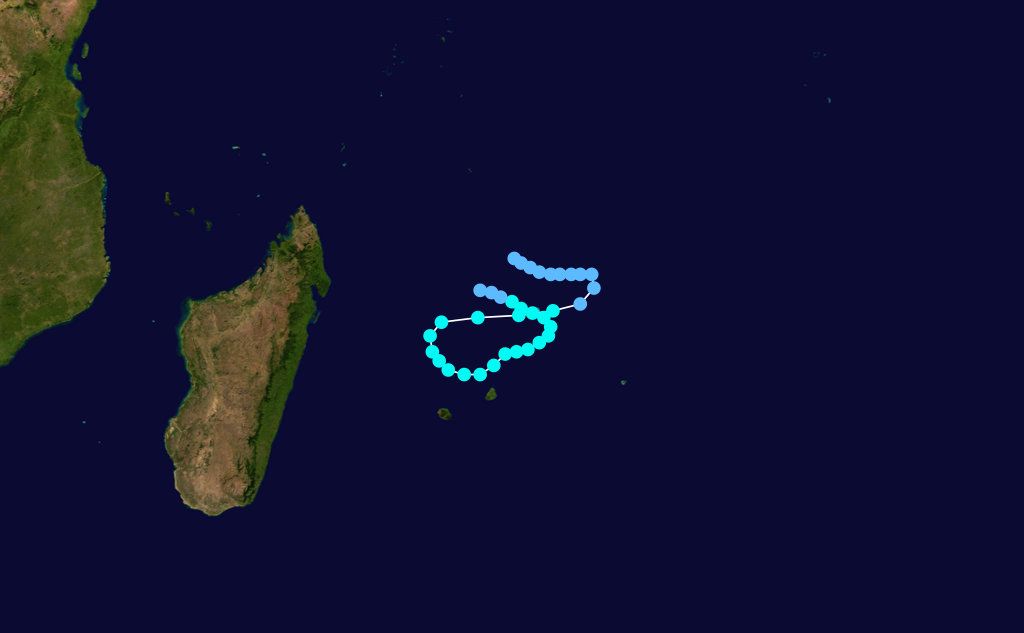
- Duration: April 6 – April 16
- Peak intensity: 75 km/h (45 mph) (10-min);

Lisa existed from April 6 to April 16.

For several days, Lisa looped to the north of the Mascarene Islands, coming within 200 km (120 mi) of Mauritius on April 9. For several the storm dropped rainfall on the islands, reaching 398 mm (15.7 in) in Mauritius and 445 mm (17.5 in) on Réunion. Flooding caused road damage in the latter island.

== See also ==
- Atlantic hurricane seasons: 1980, 1981
- Eastern Pacific hurricane seasons: 1980, 1981
- Western Pacific typhoon seasons: 1980, 1981
- North Indian Ocean cyclone seasons: 1980, 1981
