= Timeline of the 1980 Atlantic hurricane season =

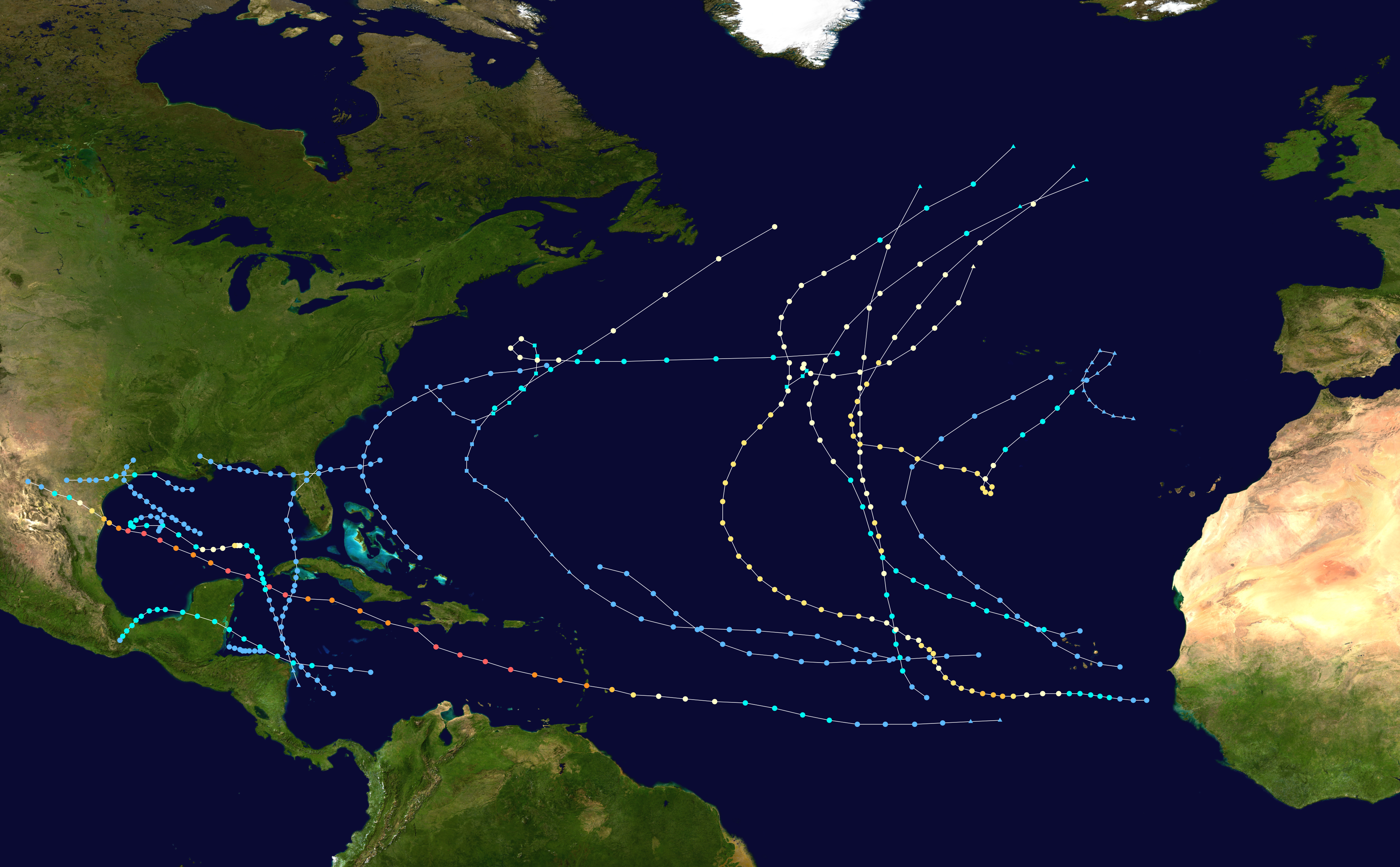
- Season summary map

Season boundaries
- First system formed: July 17, 1980
- Last system dissipated: November 28, 1980

Strongest system
- Name: Allen
- Maximum winds: 190 mph (305 km/h) (1-minute sustained)
- Lowest pressure: 899 mbar (hPa; 26.55 inHg)

Longest lasting system
- Name: Frances
- Duration: 14.75 days
Storm articles
- Hurricane Allen
- Tropical Storm Danielle (1980)
- Tropical Storm Hermine (1980)
- Hurricane Jeanne (1980)
- Hurricane Karl (1980)

The 1980 Atlantic hurricane season was an event in the annual tropical cyclone season in the north Atlantic Ocean. It was an average Atlantic hurricane season in which eleven named storms formed. (Note: An average hurricane season produces 12 named storms, of which 6 become hurricanes, including 3 major hurricanes.) The season officially began on June 1, 1980 and ended November 30, 1980. These dates, adopted by convention, historically describe the period in each year when most Atlantic systems form. Even so, Tropical Depression One did not form until July 17. The season's final storm, Hurricane Karl, dissipated on November 28.

The season produced fourteen tropical depressions, of which 12 intensified into tropical storms, four became hurricanes and two became major hurricanes. (Note: A major hurricane is a storm that ranks as Category 3 or higher on the Saffir–Simpson scale.) The only significant storm during the season was Hurricane Allen, a long-lived Cape Verde-type hurricane that became one of the strongest hurricanes recorded in the Atlantic Ocean, as well as the earliest Category 5 hurricane on the Saffir–Simpson scale ever recorded, a record that stood until Hurricane Emily during the 2005 season. Allen reached its peak intensity with maximum sustained winds of 190 mph (305 km/h) with a minimum barometric pressure of 899 mbar (hPa; 26.55 inHg).

This timeline documents tropical cyclone formations, strengthening, weakening, landfalls, extratropical transitions, and dissipations during the season. It includes information that was not released throughout the season, meaning that data from post-storm reviews by the National Hurricane Center, such as a storm that was not initially warned upon, has been included.

The time stamp for each event is first stated using Coordinated Universal Time (UTC), the 24-hour clock where 00:00 = midnight UTC. The NHC uses both UTC and the time zone where the center of the tropical cyclone is currently located. The time zones utilized (east to west) prior to 2020 were: Atlantic, Eastern, and Central. In this timeline, the respective area time is included in parentheses. Additionally, figures for maximum sustained winds and position estimates are rounded to the nearest 5 units (miles, or kilometers), following National Hurricane Center practice. Direct wind observations are rounded to the nearest whole number. Atmospheric pressures are listed to the nearest millibar and nearest hundredth of an inch of mercury.

== Timeline ==
=== June ===
June 1

- The 1980 Atlantic hurricane season officially begins.

=== July ===
Track map of Tropical Depression One.

July 18

- Tropical Depression One forms in the central Gulf of Mexico.

July 21

- Tropical Depression One dissipates over Texas.

=== August ===
August 1

- 0000 UTC (8 p.m. AST July 31) – Tropical Depression Two forms in the Eastern Atlantic.

August 2

- 0000 UTC (8 p.m. AST August 1) – Tropical Depression Two strengthens into Tropical Storm Allen roughly halfway between the Lesser Antilles and Africa.

August 3

- 0000 UTC (8 p.m. AST August 2) – Tropical Storm Allen strengthens to a Category 1 hurricane approximately 650 miles (1,050 km) east of St. Lucia.
- 1800 UTC (2 p.m. AST) – Hurricane Allen strengthens to a Category 2 hurricane.

August 4

- 0000 UTC (8 p.m. AST August 3) – Hurricane Allen strengthens into a Category 3 hurricane.
- 0600 UTC (2 a.m. AST) – Hurricane Allen strengthens to a Category 4 hurricane to the north of St. Vincent.

August 5

- 0000 UTC (8 p.m. AST August 4) – Hurricane Allen strengthens into a Category 5 hurricane.

August 6

- 0600 UTC (2 a.m. AST) – Hurricane Allen weakens to a Category 4 hurricane.

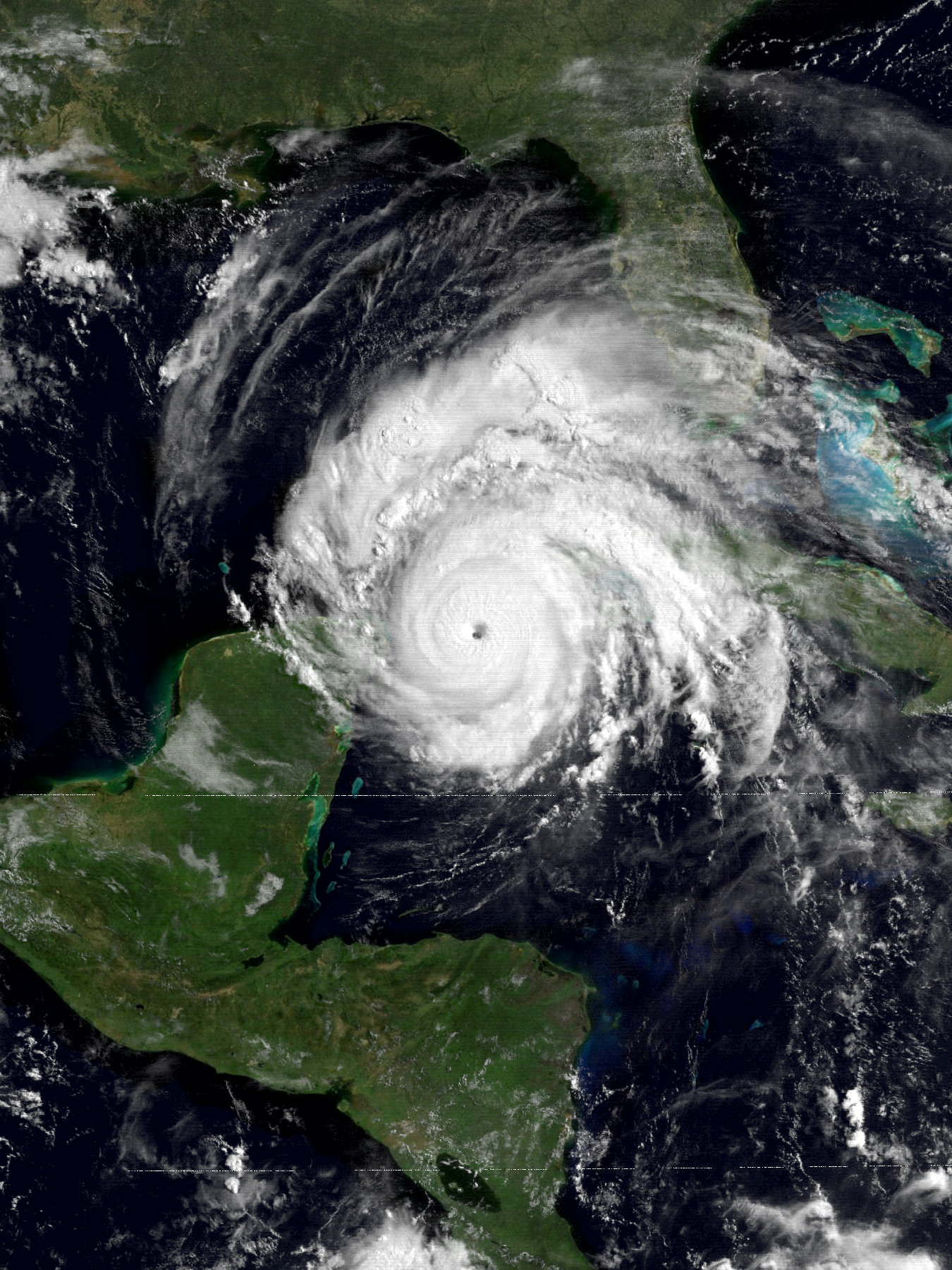
Satellite imagery of Hurricane Allen near peak intensity

August 7

- 0600 UTC (2 a.m. AST) – Hurricane Allen re-strengthens to a Category 5 hurricane.
- 1800 UTC (2 p.m. AST) – Hurricane Allen reaches a peak intensity of 190 mph (305 km/h) and a minimum barometric pressure of 899 mbar (hPa; 26.55 inHg).

August 8

- 0600 UTC (2 a.m. AST) – Hurricane Allen weakens to a Category 4 hurricane.

August 9

- 0000 UTC (8 p.m. AST August 8) – Hurricane Allen re-strengthens to a Category 5 hurricane.
- 1800 UTC (2 p.m. AST) – Hurricane Allen weakens to a Category 4 hurricane.

August 10

- 0000 UTC (8 p.m. AST August 9) – Hurricane Allen weakens to a Category 3 hurricane.
- 1200 UTC (8 a.m. AST) – Hurricane Allen weakens to a Category 2 hurricane.
- 1800 UTC (2 p.m. AST) – Hurricane Allen weakens to a Category 1 hurricane.

August 11

- 0000 UTC (8 p.m. AST August 10) – Hurricane Allen weakens to a tropical storm.
- 1200 UTC (8 a.m. AST) – Tropical Storm Allen weakens to a tropical depression.
- 1800 UTC (2 p.m. AST) – Tropical Depression Allen dissipates.

August 13

- Tropical Depression Four forms to the east of the Cape Verde Islands.

August 14

- 0000 UTC (8 p.m. AST August 13) – Tropical Depression Five forms roughly midway between the Cape Verde Islands and the Windward Islands.
- 1200 UTC (8 a.m. AST) – Tropical Storm Five strengthens into Tropical Storm Bonnie.

Hurricane Bonnie on August 16

August 16

- Tropical Depression Four becomes a remnant low near the Azores.
- 0000 UTC (8 p.m. AST August 15) – Tropical Storm Bonnie strengthens to a Category 1 hurricane.
- 0600 UTC (2 a.m. AST) – Hurricane Bonnie strengthens to a Category 2 hurricane.

August 17

- 0000 UTC (8 p.m. AST August 16) – Hurricane Bonnie weakens to a Category 1 hurricane.

August 19

- 1800 UTC (2 p.m. AST) – Bonnie transitions into an extratropical storm.

August 20

- 1200 UTC (8 a.m. AST) – A subtropical depression forms several hundred miles off the Outer banks of North Carolina.

Hurricane Charley near peak intensity.

August 21

- 1200 UTC (8 a.m. AST) – The subtropical storm strengthens into Subtropical Storm Charley.

August 23

- 0000 UTC (8 p.m. AST August 22) – Subtropical Storm Charley strengthened and transitions into a fully tropical Category 1 hurricane.

August 24

- 0600 UTC (2 a.m. AST) – Hurricane Charley weakens to a tropical storm.

August 25

- Tropical Depression Six forms to the west of the Cape Verde Islands.

August 26

- 0000 UTC (8 p.m. AST August 25) – Tropical Storm Charley merged with an intense extratropical cyclone.

August 29

- Tropical Depression Six degenerates to a remnant low.

=== September ===
September 1

- 0000 UTC (8 p.m. AST August 31) – Tropical Depression Seven forms in the Central Atlantic.

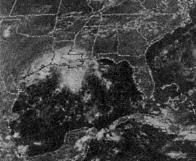
Tropical Storm Danielle making landfall

September 4

- 1200 UTC (8 a.m. AST) – Tropical Depression Nine forms in the Eastern Atlantic.
- 1800 UTC (2 p.m. AST) – Tropical Depression Eight forms off the coast of Louisiana.

September 5

- 0000 UTC (8 p.m. AST September 4) – Tropical Depression Nine strengthens into Tropical Storm Earl.
- 1200 UTC (8 a.m. AST) – Tropical Depression Seven strengthens into a subtropical storm.
- 1800 UTC (2 p.m. AST) – Tropical Depression Eight strengthens into Tropical Storm Danielle.

September 6

- 0000 UTC (8 p.m. AST September 5) – Tropical Depression Ten forms off the coast of Africa.
- 1200 UTC (8 a.m. AST) – Tropical Storm Danielle weakens to a tropical depression.
- 1800 UTC (2 p.m. AST) – Tropical Depression Ten strengthens to Tropical Storm Frances.

September 7

- 0000 UTC (8 p.m. AST September 6) – The subtropical storm transitioned into Tropical Storm Georges.
- 1200 UTC (8 a.m. AST) – Tropical Depression Danielle dissipates over Texas.

Hurricane Earl as seen from satellite on September 8

September 8

- 0000 UTC (8 p.m. September 7) – Tropical Storm Frances strengthens into a Category 1 hurricane.
- 0000 UTC (8 p.m. September 7) – Tropical Storm Georges strengthens into a Category 1 hurricane.
- 0600 UTC (2 a.m. AST) – Tropical Storm Earl strengthens into a Category 1 hurricane.
- 1800 UTC (2 p.m. AST) – Hurricane Frances strengthens into a Category 2 hurricane.
- 1800 UTC (2 p.m. AST) – Hurricane Georges transitions into an extratropical cyclone.

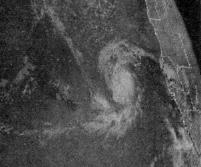
Frances as a hurricane in the Eastern Atlantic.

September 9

- 0000 UTC (8 p.m. AST September 8) – Hurricane Frances strengthens into a Category 3 hurricane.
- 1800 UTC (2 p.m. AST) – Hurricane Frances weakens into a Category 2 hurricane.

September 10

- 1200 UTC (8 a.m. AST) – Hurricane Earl weakens into a tropical storm.
- 1800 UTC (2 p.m. AST) – Tropical Storm Earl transitions into an extratropical storm.

September 12

- 0000 UTC (8 p.m. AST September 11) – Hurricane Frances weakens into a Category 1 hurricane

September 13

- 0600 UTC (2 a.m. AST) – Hurricane Frances re-strengthens into a Category 2 hurricane.

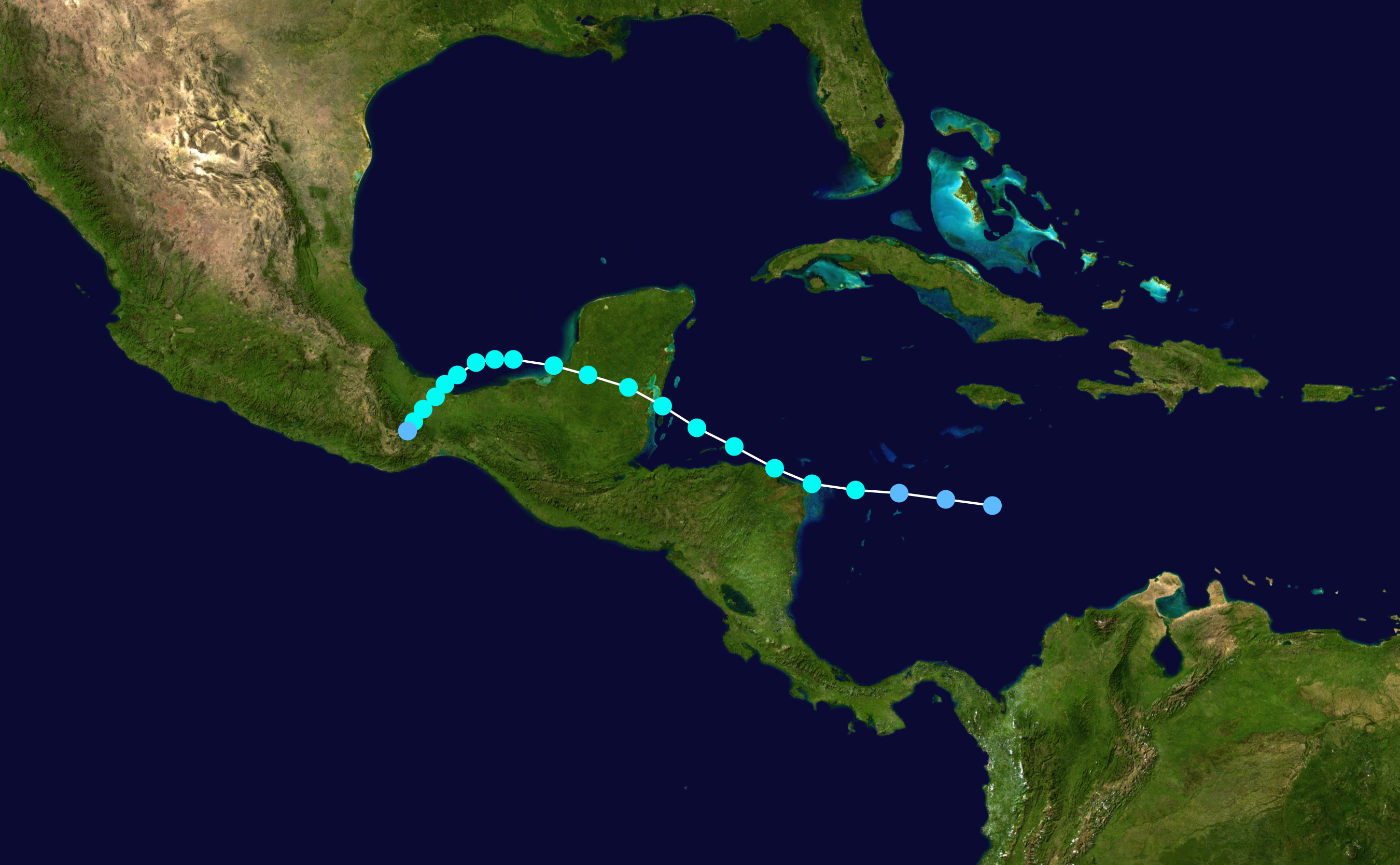
Track map of Tropical Storm Hermine.

September 17

- 1200 UTC (8 a.m. AST) – Hurricane Frances weakens into a Category 1 hurricane.

September 20

- 0600 UTC (2 a.m. AST) – Hurricane Frances weakens into a tropical storm.
- 1200 UTC (8 a.m. AST) – Tropical Depression Eleven forms approximately 237 miles (381 kilometers) to the south of Kingston, Jamaica.

September 21

- 0000 UTC (8 p.m. AST) – Tropical Storm Frances transitions into an extratropical storm.
- 0600 UTC (2 a.m. AST) – Tropical Depression Eleven strengthens into Tropical Storm Hermine.

September 22

- 1200 UTC (8 a.m. AST) – Tropical Storm Hermine makes landfall in Belize with maximum sustained winds of 70 mph (115 km/h).

September 24

- 0600 UTC (2 a.m. AST) – Tropical Storm Hermine makes landfall in Coatzacoalcos, Mexico with maximum sustained winds of 70 mph (115 km/h).

September 25

- 1800 UTC (2 p.m. AST) – Tropical Storm Hermine weakens into a tropical depression.

September 26

- 0000 UTC (8 p.m. AST September 25) – Tropical Depression Hermine dissipates over Mexico.

=== October ===
October 4

- 1200 UTC (8 a.m. AST September 30) – Tropical Depression Twelve forms near the Azores.
- 1800 UTC (2 p.m. AST) – Tropical Depression Twelve strengthens into Tropical Storm Ivan.

Hurricane Ivan as seen from satellite on October 6.

October 6

- 0000 UTC (8 p.m. AST October 5) – Tropical Storm Ivan strengthens into a Category 1 hurricane.
- 1200 UTC (8 a.m. AST) – Hurricane Ivan strengthens into a Category 2 hurricane.

October 10

- 1800 UTC (2 p.m. AST) – Hurricane Ivan weakens into a Category 1 hurricane.

October 12

- 0000 UTC (8 p.m. AST) – Hurricane Ivan transitions into an extratropical cyclone.

=== November ===
November 8

- 1800 UTC (2 p.m. AST) – Tropical Depression Thirteen forms near the coast of Nicaragua.

November 9

- 1200 UTC (8 a.m. AST) – Tropical Depression Thirteen strengthens into Tropical Storm Jeanne.

November 11

- 1200 UTC (8 a.m. AST) – Tropical Storm Jeanne strengthens into a Category 1 hurricane.

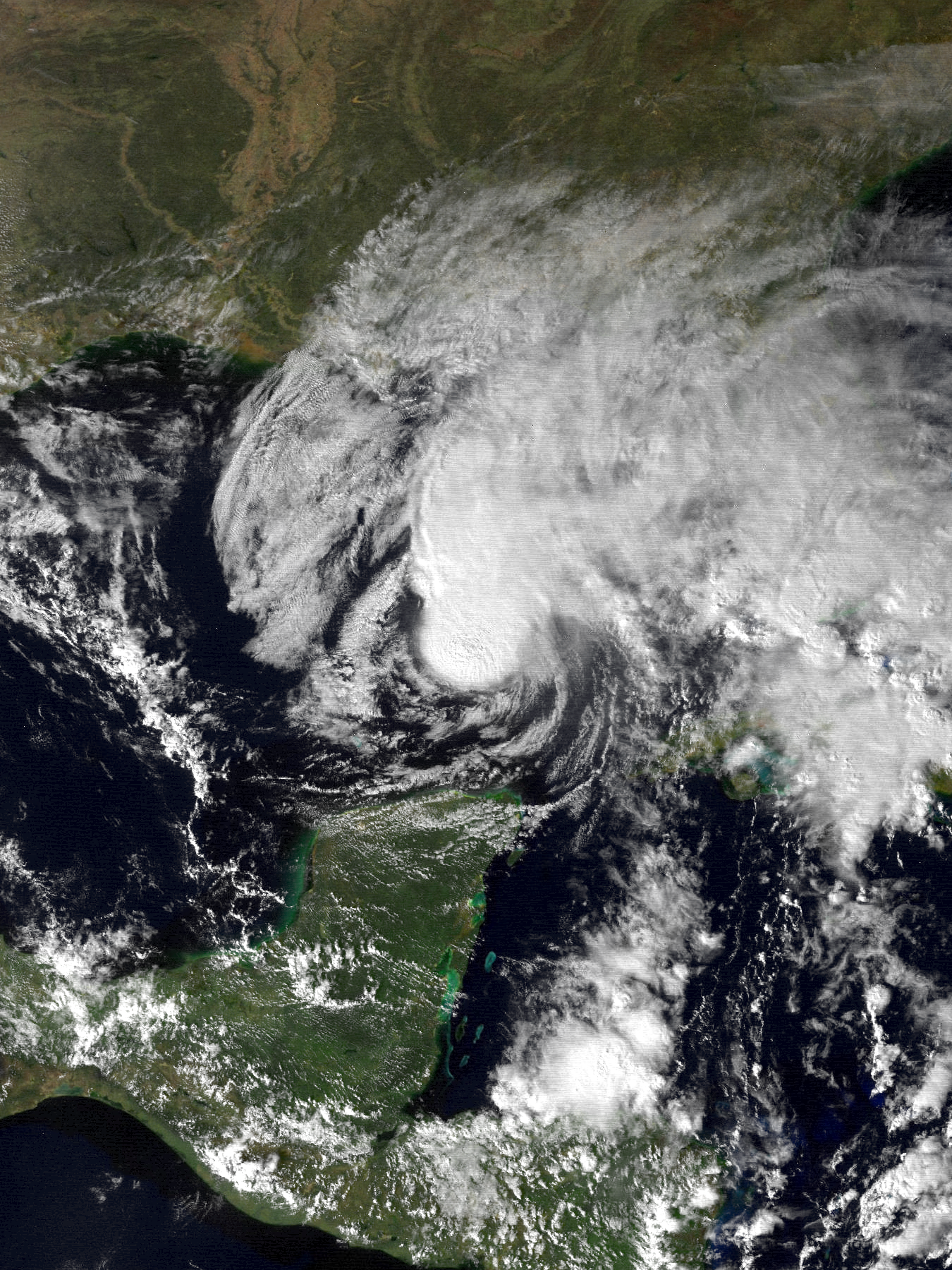
Hurricane Jeanne in the Gulf of Mexico on November 11.

November 12

- Tropical Depression Fourteen forms north of Panama.
- 0000 UTC (8 p.m. AST November 11) – Hurricane Jeanne strengthens into a Category 2 hurricane.
- 0600 UTC (2 a.m. AST) – Hurricane Jeanne weakens into a Category 1 hurricane.

November 13

- 0000 UTC (8 p.m. AST November 12) – Hurricane Jeanne weakens into a tropical storm.

November 15

- 0000 UTC (8 p.m. AST November 14) – Tropical Storm Jeanne weakens into a tropical depression.

November 16

- 0600 UTC (2 a.m. AST) – Tropical Depression Jeanne dissipates in the western Gulf of Mexico.

November 18

- Tropical Depression Fourteen dissipates west of Florida.

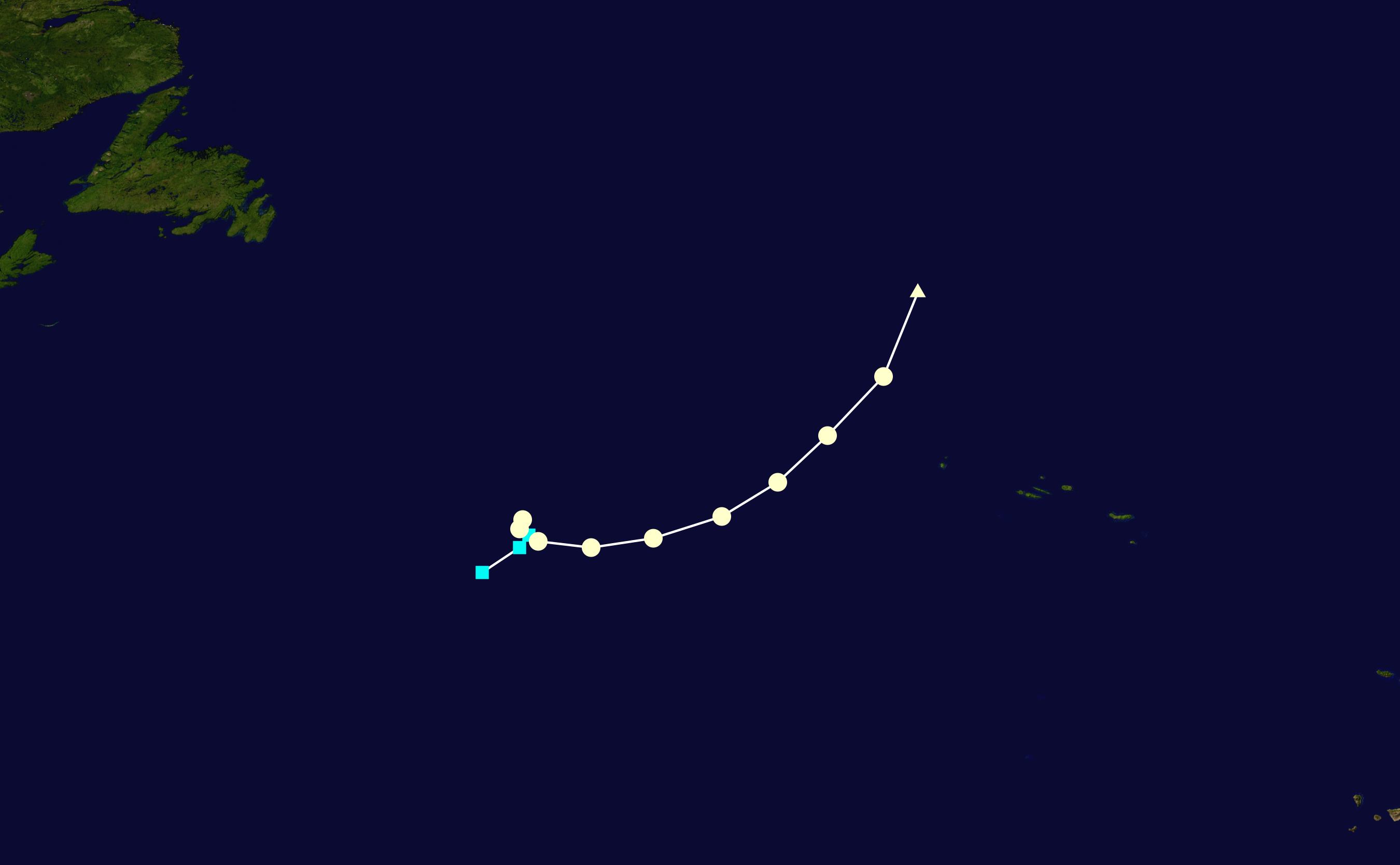
Track map of Hurricane Karl.

November 25

- 0000 UTC (8 p.m. AST November 24) – Subtropical storm Karl forms in the open Atlantic.
- 1800 UTC (2 p.m. AST) – Karl becomes fully tropical, strengthens into a Category 1 hurricane.

November 28

- 0000 UTC (8 p.m. AST November 27) – Hurricane Karl transitions into an extratropical cyclone.

November 30

- The 1980 Atlantic hurricane season officially ends.

== See also ==
- Lists of Atlantic hurricanes
