= Agriculture in Martinique =

Industry in Martinique, France

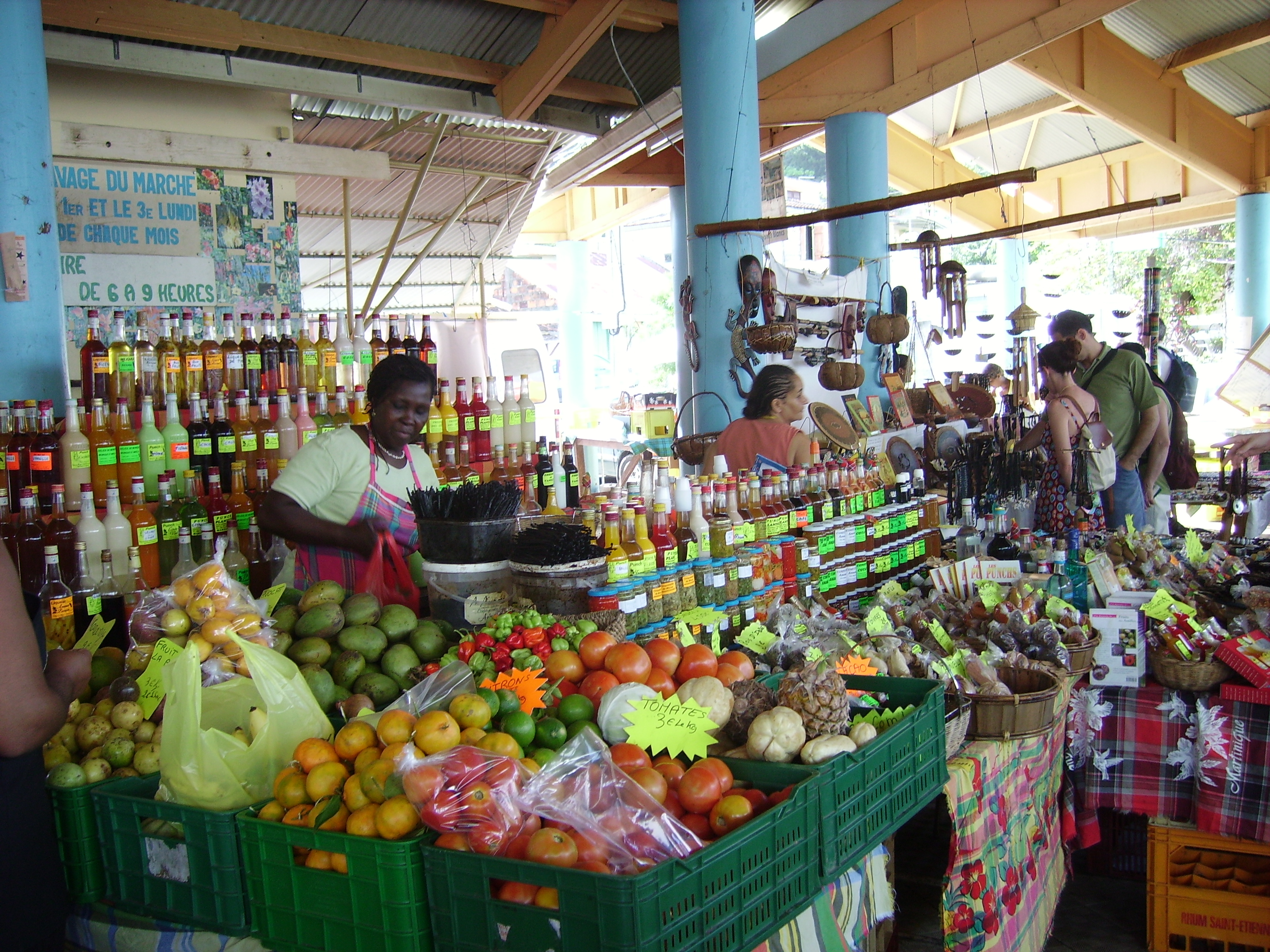
Produce vendors in Martinique.

Agriculture in Martinique is an important industry. The soil of the island is extremely fertile, and the climate is tropical making excellent conditions for growing tropical fruits and other exotic plants. In the past, agriculture was the primary source of income for the island, though this has changed over recent years as demand for important exports like sugar has declined and damage to crops as a result of hurricanes has increased. At present agriculture accounts for around 6% of Martinique's GDP (Gross Domestic Product) which ranks it far below tourism and other services, the island's primary source of revenue.

== Agriculture in Martinique's History ==
The original inhabitants of Martinique, the Arawaks and Caribs, did some cultivating on the island though substantial agricultural development did not occur until the French colonized the island in 1635. Following the French's settlement on the island, sugarcane became a widely harvested resource which made the island one of France's prime overseas territories.

The island became even more lucrative after the introduction of coffea (coffee) in 1723, and the productivity of the island interested other foreign powers. The Dutch attacked the island in 1674, but were repulsed. The British attacked and 1693 and 1759 only to be repelled as well. However, the British did successfully conquer the island in 1762 but returned it to the French after the Treaty of Paris of 1763. The British would occupy the island twice more between 1794 and 1802, and 1809-1814 before again returning the island to France under the treaties of Amiens and Vienna respectively.

Most agricultural labor on the island was driven by slaves from Africa. Numerous slave uprisings occurred during the early 19th century and ultimately led to the abolition of the practice in 1848. Following this plantation owners imported workers from India and China to lower their labor costs.

Martinique became economically depressed in the later 1950s. During this period bananas became a larger and more important agricultural product for the island. The 1979 and 1980 Atlantic hurricane seasons caused major agricultural and economic disruption to the island which continued the island's economic slump.

== Products ==
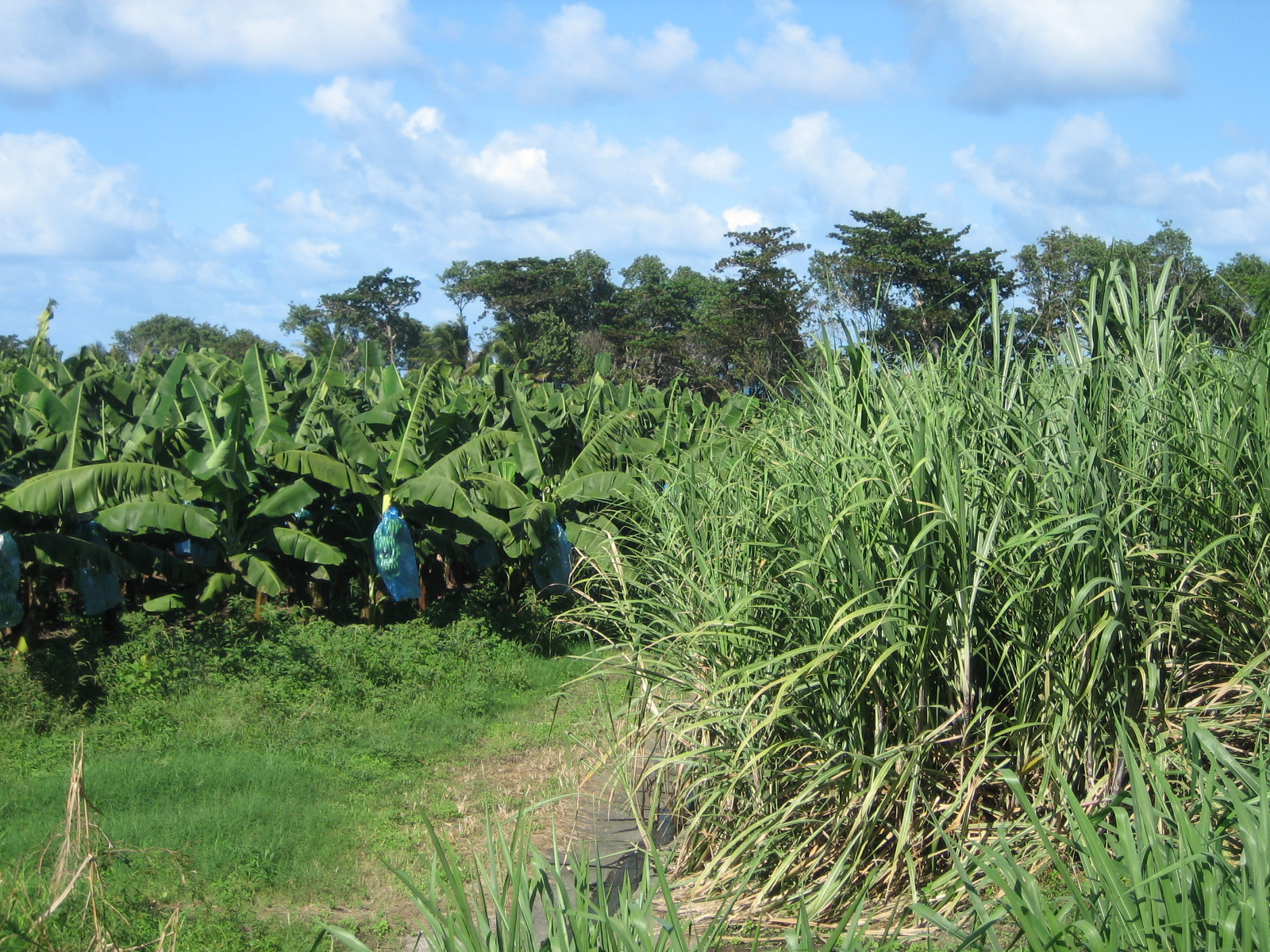
Sugarcane (right) and Banana (left) plants on Martinique.

Martinique produces many agricultural products including but not limited too: sugarcane, bananas, coffea, pineapple, avocados, eggplants, citrus fruit, yams, cassava, sweet potatoes and exotic flowers.

Sugarcane, once the driving force of the island's economy, though still exported is now used more commonly for the production of rum, which is also exported. Approximately 3,140 ha of the arable land on Martinique is used to grow sugarcane. Between 1989 and 2000 harvests of sugarcane increased by 7%.
