= List of storms named Danielle =

The name Danielle has been used for eight tropical cyclones in the Atlantic Ocean:

- Tropical Storm Danielle (1980) – flooded almost every street in Beaumont, Texas
- Tropical Storm Danielle (1986) – the only tropical storm to move through the Caribbean Sea in 1986
- Tropical Storm Danielle (1992) – made landfall on the Delmarva Peninsula
- Hurricane Danielle (1998) – a Category 2 hurricane that led to the rescue of Tori Murden
- Hurricane Danielle (2004) – a Category 2 hurricane that affected Cape Verde
- Hurricane Danielle (2010) – a Category 4 hurricane that forced researchers examining the Titanic to seek refuge in Newfoundland
- Tropical Storm Danielle (2016) – became the earliest fourth-named storm of an Atlantic hurricane season
- Hurricane Danielle (2022) – a Category 1 hurricane that affected Portugal as a European windstorm

== See also ==
- Cyclone Daniella (1996) – a South-West Indian Ocean tropical cyclone with a similar name
