= Tropical Storm Hermine (1980) =

Atlantic tropical storm in 1980

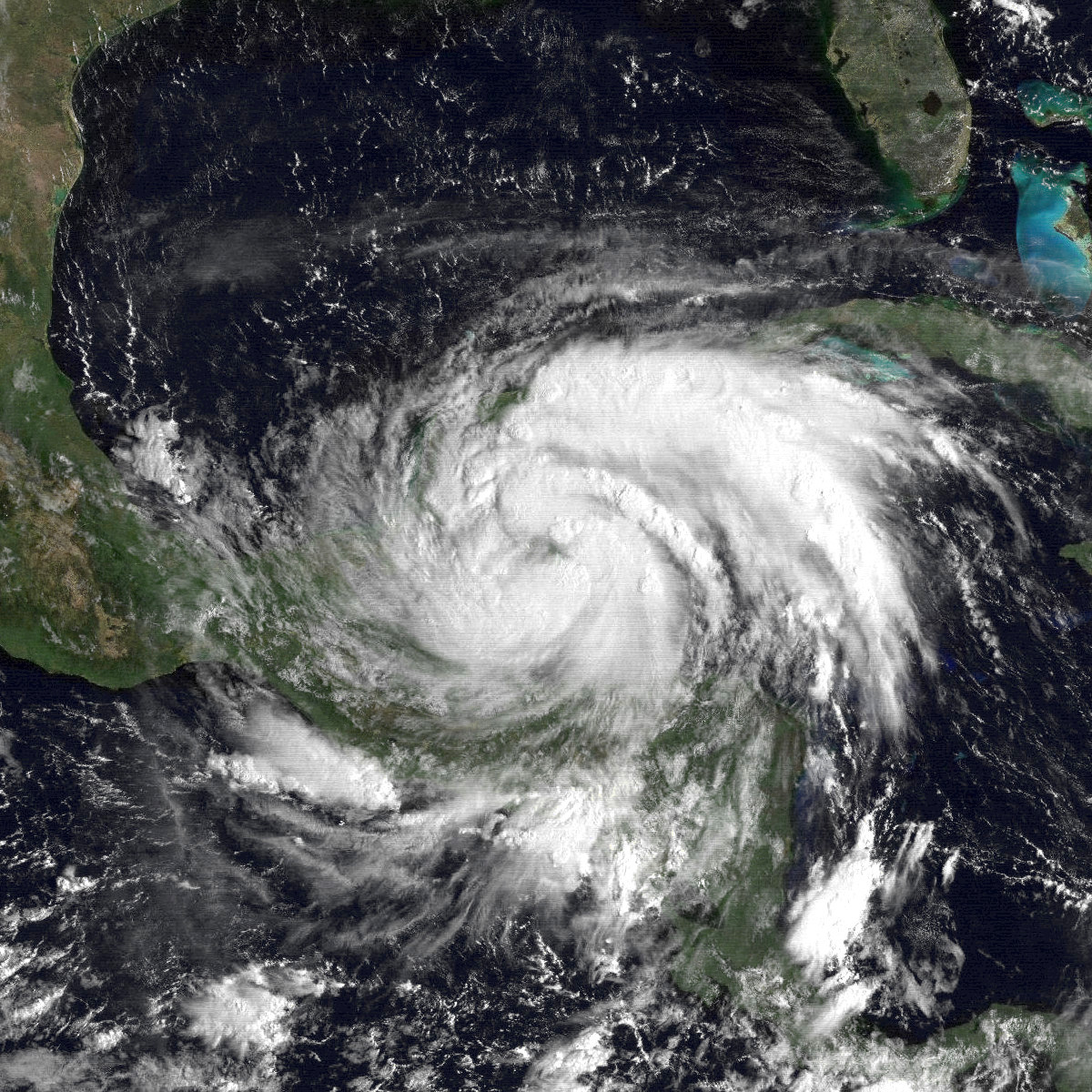
- Tropical Storm Hermine at peak intensity making landfall in Belize on September 22

Meteorological history
- Formed: September 20, 1980
- Dissipated: September 26, 1980

Tropical storm
- 1-minute sustained (SSHWS/NWS)
- Highest winds: 70 mph (110 km/h)
- Lowest pressure: 993 mbar (hPa); 29.32 inHg

Overall effects
- Fatalities: ≥38 direct
- Areas affected: Central America, Mexico
- IBTrACS
- Part of the 1980 Atlantic hurricane season

Tropical Storm Hermine caused significant flooding in Mexico during September 1980. The eleventh tropical cyclone and eight named storm of the 1980 Atlantic hurricane season, Hermine developed from a tropical wave that emerged into the Atlantic from the west coast of Africa on September 11. After uneventfully crossing the Atlantic Ocean, the system developed a well-defined circulation while in the Caribbean Sea on September 20 and was then classified as a tropical depression. After becoming a tropical cyclone, the depression steadily strengthened as it tracked nearly due westward. By September 21, it strengthened into Tropical Storm Hermine and brushed the northern coast of Honduras shortly thereafter. It nearly became a hurricane before it made landfall in Belize on September 22. After weakening over the Yucatan Peninsula, Hermine restrengthened to near-hurricane status again over the Gulf of Mexico before making landfall in the Mexican state of Veracruz. Hermine steadily weakened inland and eventually dissipated on September 26.

In Belize, the storm knocked out communications, though damage in that country was minimal. Heavy rainfall in Guatemala triggered landslides, causing eight fatalities. Additionally, portions of the Pan-American Highway were shut down due to flooding. In Mexico, many areas reported at least 10 inches (250 mm) of precipitation, while a few locations experience more than 30 inches (760 mm) of rain. At the capital city of Mexico City, ten districts reported significant street flooding. As a result of torrential rainfall, at least 30 fatalities occurred, with dozens more missing, and leaving 25,000 homeless. However, no estimates of damage associated with the storm were produced.

== Meteorological history ==
Map plotting the storm's track and intensity, according to the Saffir–Simpson scale Map key Saffir–Simpson scale Tropical depression (≤38 mph, ≤62 km/h) Tropical storm (39–73 mph, 63–118 km/h) Category 1 (74–95 mph, 119–153 km/h) Category 2 (96–110 mph, 154–177 km/h) Category 3 (111–129 mph, 178–208 km/h) Category 4 (130–156 mph, 209–251 km/h) Category 5 (≥157 mph, ≥252 km/h) Unknown Storm type Tropical cyclone Subtropical cyclone Extratropical cyclone, remnant low, tropical disturbance, or monsoon depression

A tropical wave emerged into the Atlantic from the west coast of Africa on September 11, though the system lacked a well-defined circulation. The tropical wave tracked westward for several days with minimal development, until reaching near the Lesser Antilles where a low-level cloud banding feature appeared, along with an increase in central convection. This suggested a possible low-level circulation, though an Air Force Reserve Flight on September 17 indicated little evidence of a circulation. On the following day, the system crossed the Lesser Antilles and entered the Caribbean Sea. As it passed near Jamaica on September 20, a low-level circulation became more apparent on satellite imagery. It is estimated that Tropical Depression Eleven developed at 1200 UTC on that day, while it was centered about 240 miles (390 km) south of Kingston, Jamaica. However, the National Hurricane Center did not initiate advisories until 2200 UTC on September 20. The depression tracked just north of due west, and by September 21, it was upgraded to Tropical Storm Hermine.

Later on September 21, Hermine passed only 5 miles (8.0 km) offshore of northeast Honduras. An Air Force Reserve flight investigated if landfall occurred, though Hermine had remained offshore. After the storm moved to the northwest away from Honduras, it began to significantly strengthen. By September 22, maximum sustained winds had increased to 70 mph (110 km/h). Shortly thereafter, Hermine made landfall near Belize City at the same intensity. The storm weakened somewhat over the Yucatán Peninsula, and sustained winds were 50 mph (80 km/h) when Hermine emerged into the Bay of Campeche on September 23. The storm quickly began to re-strengthen as it tracked generally westward in the Gulf of Mexico. Although several computer models suggested a northward turn, Hermine drifted southwestward, possibly due to high terrain over Mexico. Hermine attained its peak intensity with winds of 70 mph (110 km/h) and a minimum pressure of 993 mbar (29.3 inHg) early on September 24, as measured by reconnaissance aircraft. After peak intensity, Hermine weakened slightly to a 65 mph (105 km/h) tropical storm. At 1200 UTC on September 24, the storm made landfall near Coatzacoalcos, Veracruz, Mexico. Hermine steadily weakened inland and by late 1500 UTC on September 25, it was downgraded to a tropical depression. Later that day, the National Hurricane Center noted that a low-level circulation could no longer be located, and by early on the following day, Hermine dissipated over the Mexican state of Oaxaca.

== Impact ==
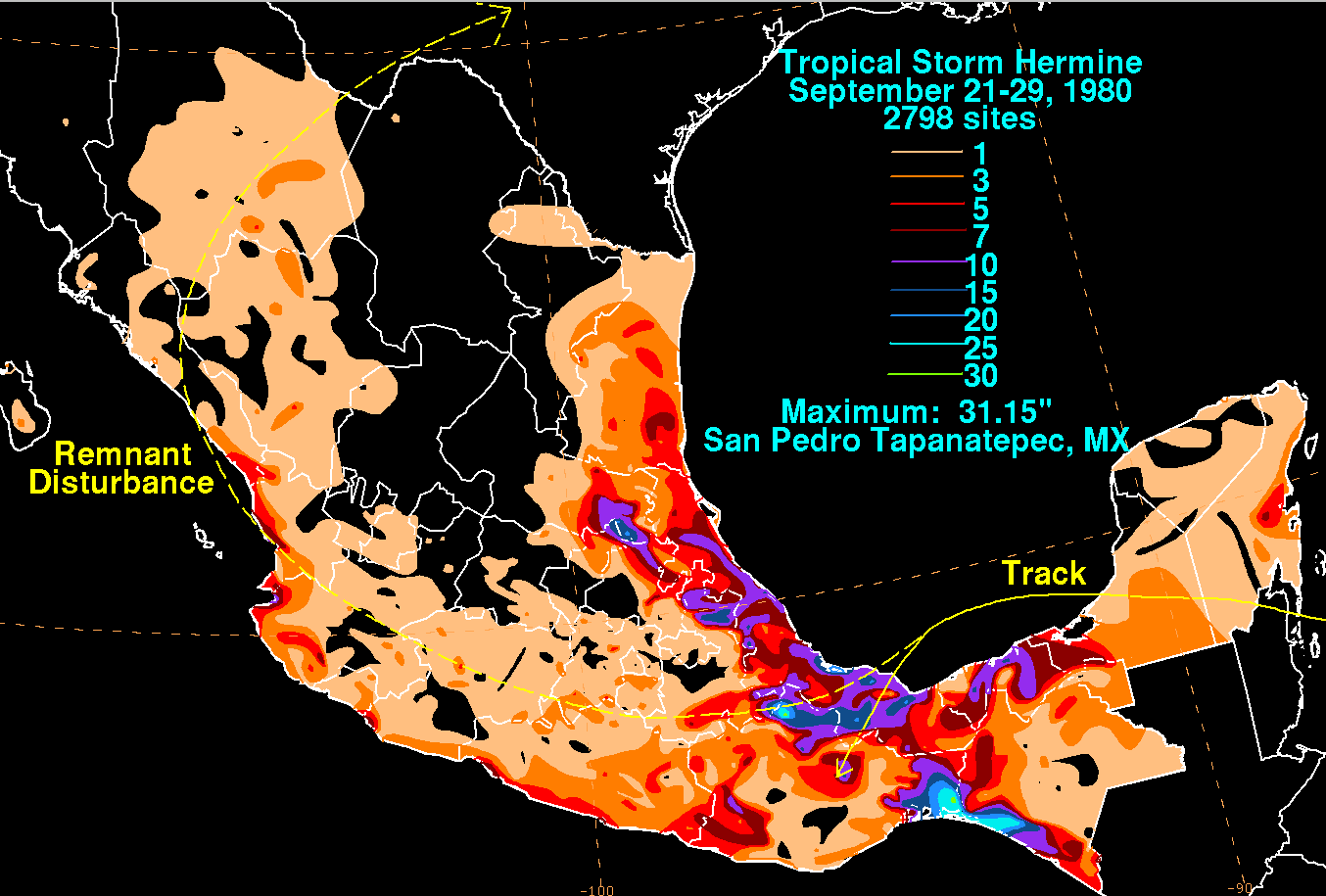
Rainfall from Tropical Storm Hermine

On September 21, the government of Belize issued a gale warning, as well as a hurricane watch, for most of the eastern coast of the country. It was canceled after Tropical Storm Hermine had moved inland. In eastern Mexico, an estimated 15,000 people evacuated from low-lying areas. Additionally, the Government of Mexico sent "advices" to "interests" in the Yucatan Peninsula. Officials in Mexico urged numerous residents along the southern Gulf of Mexico coast and surrounding states to evacuate prior to the storm's arrival. Timely warnings were later credited for reducing the loss of life.

While crossing the southern Yucatán Peninsula, Hermine brought locally heavy rains and strong winds to eastern Mexico and much of Belize – then a colony of the United Kingdom. Between 9 and 10 inches (230 and 250 mm) of rain fell at the Philip S. W. Goldson International Airport. In Quintana Roo, more than 7 in (180 mm) of precipitation fell in localized areas, leading to floods. The storm also temporarily knocked out communication to all of Belize and Chetumal, Mexico. According to officials in the region, little damage took place during Hermine's passage. Heavy rains in Guatemala triggered landslides, killing at least eight people after crushing a bus. Portions of the Pan American Highway were shut down due to debris.

Tropical Storm Hermine and the remnants caused heavy rainfall across along most of the southern and eastern parts of Mexico. Rainfall totals from Hermine peaked at 31.15 in (791 mm) in San Pedro Tapanatepec, Oaxaca. When the remnants of Hermine reached the Pacific coast of Mexico, several inches of rain were recorded. Throughout the country, the hardest hit areas were Veracruz, Oaxaca, Chiapas and Guerrero. More than 30 people were killed by the storm and dozens more left missing. Ten districts in Mexico City were brought to a standstill as flood waters blocked off streets. In the small towns of Cintalapa and Jiquiplan, flooding killed eight people and left twenty more missing. In addition to the loss of life, at least 25,000 residents were left homeless due to severe flooding. Two small dams broke due to excessive rains near Tuxtla Gutiérrez, prompting the evacuation of 2,000 residents in nearby areas. In response to the storm, an estimated 15,000 personnel were deployed to assist in relief efforts.

== See also ==
- Tropical Storm Barry (2013)
- Tropical Storm Harvey (2011)
- 1980 Atlantic hurricane season
- Other tropical cyclones named Hermine
