= 1980 Atlantic hurricane season =

- Season summary map

Seasonal boundaries
- First system formed: July 17, 1980
- Last system dissipated: November 28, 1980

Strongest storm
- Name: Allen (Tied for strongest known windspeeds in the Atlantic basin)
  - Maximum winds: 190 mph (305 km/h) (1-minute sustained)
  - Lowest pressure: 899 mbar (hPa; 26.55 inHg)

Seasonal statistics
- Total depressions: 16
- Total storms: 11
- Hurricanes: 9
- Major hurricanes (Cat. 3+): 2
- Total fatalities: 317 total
- Total damage: $1.596 billion (1980 USD)

Related articles
- Timeline of the 1980 Atlantic hurricane season; 1980 Pacific hurricane season; 1980 Pacific typhoon season; 1980 North Indian Ocean cyclone season

The 1980 Atlantic hurricane season featured nine hurricanes, the most since 1969. This hurricane season was fairly active, with sixteen tropical cyclones forming, eleven of which strengthened into named tropical storms. The season officially began on June 1, 1980, and lasted until November 30, 1980. The first system, Tropical Depression One, formed on July 17 and made landfall near the Galveston area. It was the first time since the 1971 season that there were no active tropical cyclones in the Atlantic basin during the month of June. The season occurred during an ENSO-neutral phase, having neither an El Niño nor a La Niña.

In August, Hurricane Allen became the then-earliest Category 5 hurricane in the calendar year on record, reaching that intensity on August 5, and had the highest maximum sustained winds for an Atlantic hurricane, now tied with Hurricane Melissa in 2025. The storm devastated portions of the Caribbean, Mexico, and the United States, causing about $1.57 billion in damages and at least 269 deaths. In late September, Tropical Storm Hermine caused significant flooding in southern Mexico, which resulted in at least 38 fatalities. In November, Hurricane Jeanne was one of only a few tropical cyclones to enter the Gulf of Mexico at hurricane intensity and not make landfall. The season concluded with Hurricane Karl dissipating on November 28, a few days before the end of the season. Collectively, the storms during the season caused at least 317 fatalities and resulted in at least US$1.6 billion in monetary losses, mostly due to Allen.

== Seasonal summary ==
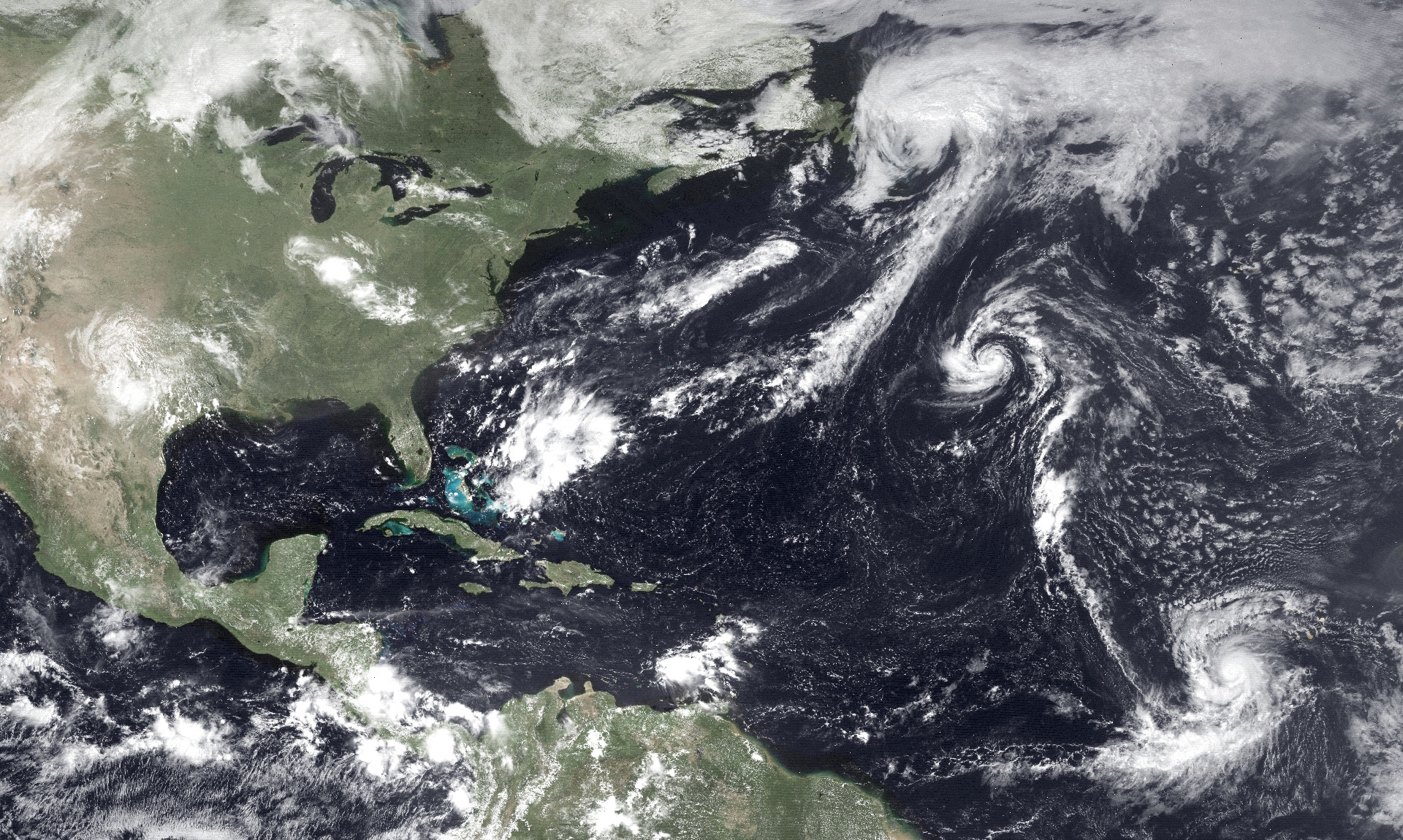
Hurricanes Earl, Frances, and Georges on September 8, 1980; the remnants of Tropical Storm Danielle are also visible over Texas

The Atlantic hurricane season officially began on June 1, though the first tropical depression did not develop until July 17. During the season, 16 tropical depressions formed. Eleven of the depressions attained tropical storm status, and nine of these attained hurricane status. Two of the hurricanes further strengthened to become major hurricanes. Only Allen made landfall at hurricane strength during the season, although Hurricane Charley and tropical storms Danielle and Hermine also caused damage and fatalities. The last storm of the season, Hurricane Karl, merged with an extratropical cyclone on November 27, three days before the official end date of November 30. Overall, the cyclones of the 1980 Atlantic hurricane season collectively caused 317 deaths and more than $1.596 billion (1980 USD) in damage.

The 1980 Atlantic hurricane season had a rather slow beginning, with only one tropical depression developing prior to the month of August. In contrast, August was an active month, with five tropical cyclones forming, three of which became hurricanes. During that month, Hurricane Allen became the earliest known Category 5 hurricane on August 5, a record later broken by only Hurricane Emily on July 16, 2005. September also had five tropical cyclones, all of which became named storms. In a 48-hour period between September 4–6, four storms (Georges, Danielle, Earl, and Frances) were named. This tied the record set in 1893 for the fastest time four storms were named within the Atlantic basin; the record was broken in 2023. Tropical cyclogenesis abruptly halted in October, with only Hurricane Ivan and a tropical depression developing in that month. However, the month of November was considered to be very active, with three storms forming during that month.

The season's activity was reflected with an accumulated cyclone energy (ACE) rating of 149, which is classified as "above normal". ACE is, broadly speaking, a measure of the power of the hurricane multiplied by the length of time it existed, so storms that last a long time, as well as particularly strong hurricanes, have high ACEs. Its only calculated for full advisories on tropical systems at or exceeding 39 mph (63 km/h), which is the threshold for tropical storm intensity.

== Systems ==
=== Tropical Depression One ===
- Tropical depression (SSHWS)
- Duration: July 17 – July 21
- Peak intensity: 35 mph (55 km/h) (1-min); 1010 mbar (hPa)

A decaying cold front entered into Gulf of Mexico, and developed a low-pressure area of July 17. Later that day, the low-pressure area developed into Tropical Depression One almost halfway between Louisiana and the Yucatán Peninsula. The depression moved northwestward, and minimal intensification occurred, as it approached the Gulf Coast of the United States. The depression made landfall in Texas near the Galveston area, and dissipated by July 21. Minimal impact was recorded from the depression, and light rainfall was reported in Texas and western Louisiana, peaking at 3.77 in (96 mm) in Refugio, Texas.

=== Hurricane Allen ===
- Category 5 hurricane (SSHWS)
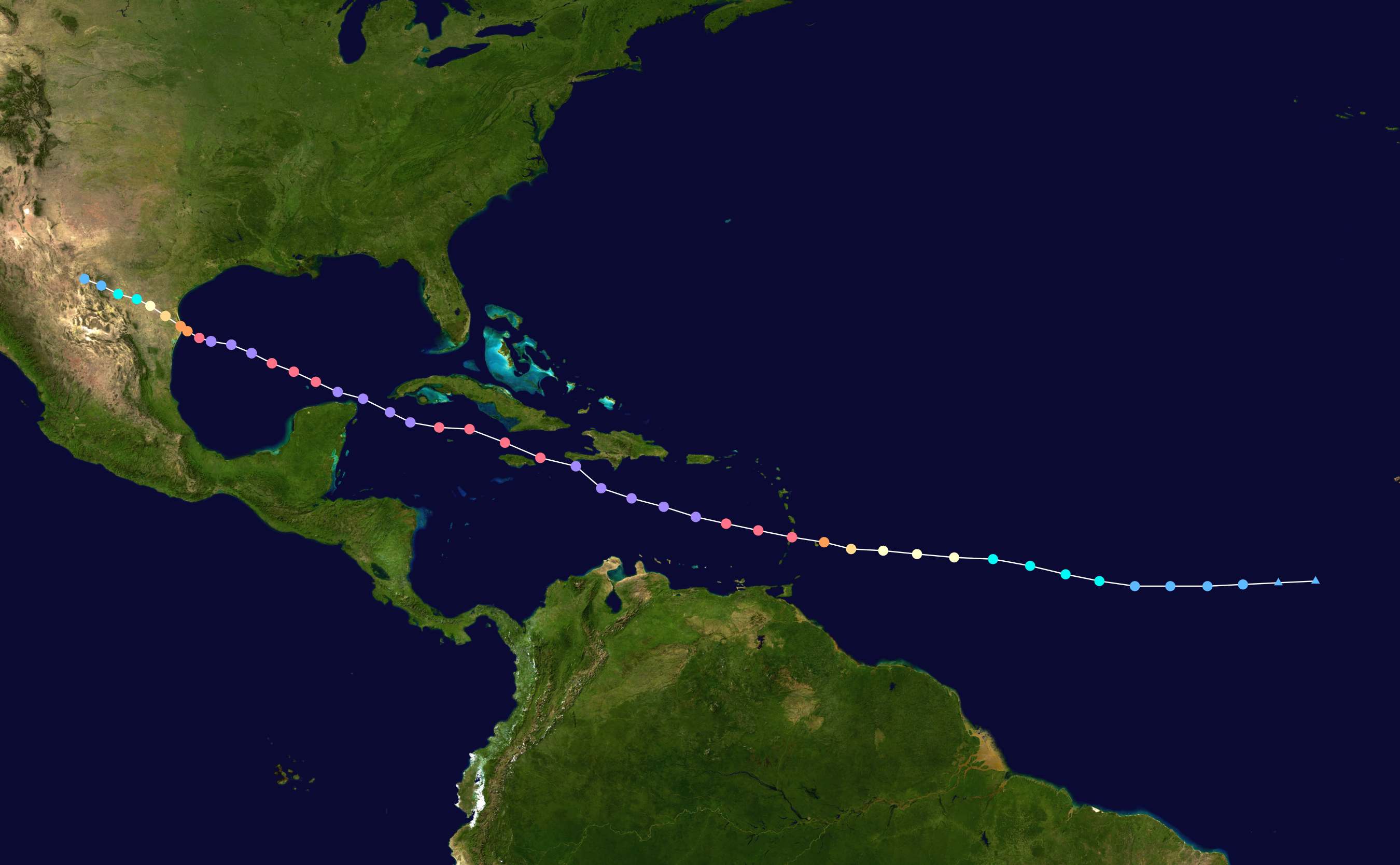
- Duration: August 1 – August 11
- Peak intensity: 190 mph (305 km/h) (1-min); 899 mbar (hPa)

A tropical wave emerged off the west coast of Africa on July 30 and quickly developed into Tropical Depression Two about two days later. By August 2, the depression had strengthened and was upgraded to Tropical Storm Allen. The storm steadily intensified and became a hurricane on August 3. Thereafter, Allen rapidly deepened, and was a major hurricane only 24 hours later. As Allen passed through the Windward Islands, it strengthened into a Category 4. Upon entering the Caribbean Sea, Allen continued to strengthen and became a Category 5 hurricane on August 5, while about halfway between Puerto Rico and Venezuela. Allen briefly curved northwestward and approached the Tiburon Peninsula of Haiti. Shortly thereafter, Allen weakened significantly on August 6, but was still a Category 4 when it bypassed Jamaica. While paralleling the south coast of Cuba, Allen re-strengthened into a Category 5 hurricane. Later that day, the storm attained its peak intensity with winds of 190 mph (305 km/h) and a minimum barometric pressure of 899 mbar (26.5 inHg). Immediately following peak intensity, Allen entered the Gulf of Mexico and weakened back to a Category 4 hurricane on August 8. On the day next, Allen re-intensified into a Category 5 hurricane while approaching Texas. However, just offshore, Allen abruptly weakened to a low-end Category 3 hurricane prior to landfall near Brownsville, Texas, on August 10. The storm quickly weakened inland and dissipated about 36 hours after striking land.

Although 500 houses were either damaged or destroyed on Barbados, losses totaled to only $1.5 million. Having passed only 8 mi (15 km) south of St. Lucia, Allen produced sustained winds as high as 104 mph (167 km/h) on the island. The storm caused 27 fatalities and $88 million in damage on that island. In addition, one death was reported in Guadeloupe. High winds and flooding in Haiti left 836,200 people homeless. In addition, 220 deaths were reported and damage exceeded $400 million. To the east in Dominican Republic, effects were less severe, though seven deaths were reported and damage was estimated at $47 million. On the island of Cuba, three fatalities occurred and losses were unknown. In northeastern Mexico, heavy rainfall occurred, though damage was minimal and no fatalities were reported. Damage was most significant in the United States, especially in the state of Texas. In Corpus Christi, gravel blew off the roofs, which broke windows throughout the city. Several tornadoes were spawned in Texas, one of which caused at least $50 million in damage in Austin. Rainfall in the state of Texas exceeded 20 in (510 mm) in some locations. A total of 24 fatalities occurred in the United States – seven in Texas and seventeen in Louisiana – most resulting from the crash of a helicopter evacuating workers from an offshore platform. Damage in United States totaled to $860 million. Overall, Hurricane Allen caused $1.57 billion in losses and caused 290 deaths.

=== Tropical Depression Four ===
- Tropical depression (SSHWS)
- Duration: August 13 – August 17
- Peak intensity: 35 mph (55 km/h) (1-min); 1010 mbar (hPa)

The third tropical depression of the season developed east of Cape Verde on August 13. However, the National Hurricane Center did not initiate advisories until August 16. As a result, the system was classified as Tropical Depression Four. After forming on August 13, the depression crossed through the Cape Verde Islands. The depression tracked northwestward and strengthened minimally, with winds never exceeding 35 mph (55 km/h). Thereafter, the depression curved and approached the eastern portion of the Azores. Tropical Depression Four moved through the islands shortly later. By early on August 17, the depression dissipated near Santa Maria Island in the Azores.

=== Hurricane Bonnie ===
- Category 2 hurricane (SSHWS)
- Duration: August 14 – August 19
- Peak intensity: 100 mph (155 km/h) (1-min); 975 mbar (hPa)

Starting on August 13, a tropical wave in the vicinity of Cape Verde began organizing into a tropical cyclone. Early on the following day, the system had developed into Tropical Depression Three while nearly halfway between the west coast of Africa and the Windward Islands. However, in post-analysis, it was revealed that the previous tropical depression had actually developed before Bonnie. Thus, those two depressions were operationally numbered incorrectly. Two reports of gale-force winds were received from ships later that day. As a result, the depression was re-classified as Tropical Storm Bonnie about twelve hours after developing. Bonnie turned in a general northward direction, possibly due to interaction with nearby Tropical Depression Four.

Based on satellite estimates, Bonnie strengthened into a hurricane at 00:00 UTC on August 16. The storm strengthened slightly further and attained its peak intensity with winds of 100 mph (155 km/h) and a minimum pressure of 975 mbar (28.8 inHg). After attaining peak intensity on August 16, Bonnie slowly weakened as it continued in an unusual northward direction. On the following day, Bonnie weakened slightly to a minimal Category 1 hurricane. The storm remained at that intensity for 72 hours as it accelerated northward across the open Atlantic. By 18:00 UTC on August 19, Bonnie transitioned into an extratropical cyclone while almost halfway between the southern tip of Greenland and the Azores.

=== Hurricane Charley ===
- Category 1 hurricane (SSHWS)
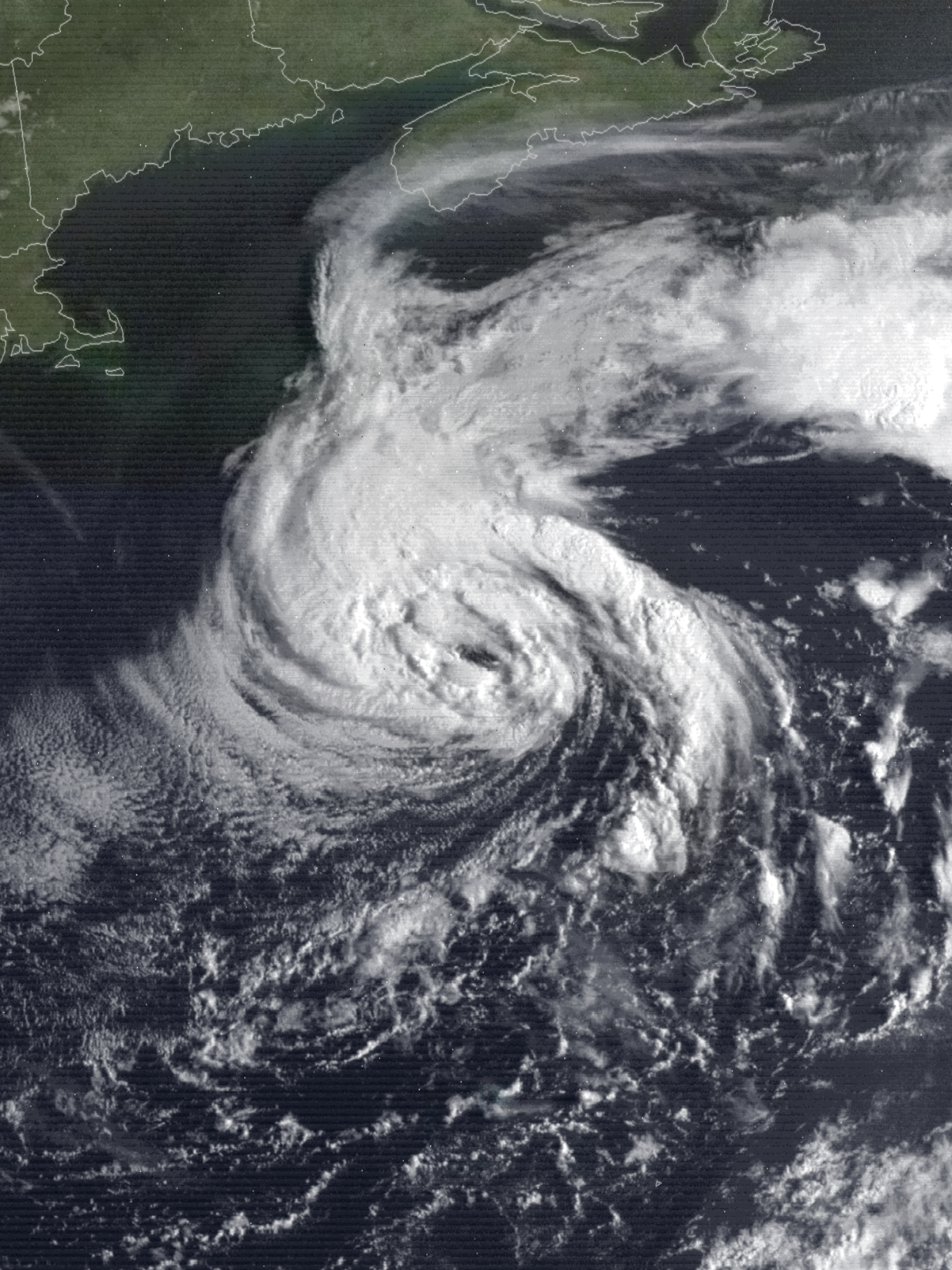
- Duration: August 20 – August 25
- Peak intensity: 80 mph (130 km/h) (1-min); 989 mbar (hPa)

An extratropical low pressure system was centered over the Mid-Atlantic United States, though it tracked southeastward and emerged into the Atlantic on August 20. Later that day, satellite imagery indicated that a well-defined low-level circulation. As a result, it was determine that the system developed into a subtropical depression at 12:00 UTC, while located about 150 mi (240 km) east-northeast of Hatteras, North Carolina. Initially, the depression tracked east-southeastward, though it curved east-northeastward by August 21. Shortly thereafter, the depression strengthened into a subtropical storm. By early on August 23, the storm had intensified and acquired enough tropical characteristics to be re-classified as Hurricane Charley.

At 12:00 UTC on August 23, Charley attained its peak intensity with winds of 80 mph (130 km/h) and a minimum pressure of 989 mbar (29.2 inHg). Following peak intensity, Charley completed a cyclonic loop and began weakening as it headed almost due-east. Charley was downgraded to a tropical storm early on August 24. The storm continued eastward and by August 26, Charley became unidentifiable as it merged with an intense extratropical cyclone, while located about 790 mi (1,270 km) southeast of Cape Race, Newfoundland. While a tropical cyclone, Charley produced rip currents along the Outer Banks of North Carolina, which drowned seven people.

=== Tropical Depression Six ===
- Tropical depression (SSHWS)
- Duration: August 25 – August 29
- Peak intensity: 35 mph (55 km/h) (1-min); 1009 mbar (hPa)

A tropical wave exited the west coast of Africa and emerged into the Atlantic Ocean on August 22. The system developed into Tropical Depression Six, while centered to the west of Cape Verde at 00:00 UTC on August 25. The depression tracked westward with minimal intensification. By 18:00 UTC on August 26, the depression reached 35 mph (55 km/h) and did not strengthen further. On the following day, the depression curved northwestward and slowly began to weaken. The depression degenerated into a tropical wave while well northeast of Puerto Rico on August 29. The remnants of Tropical Depression Six continued westward and interacted with a low-pressure system over Florida. Eventually, the system developed into Tropical Depression Eight on September 4, which later became Tropical Storm Danielle.

=== Hurricane Georges ===
- Category 1 hurricane (SSHWS)
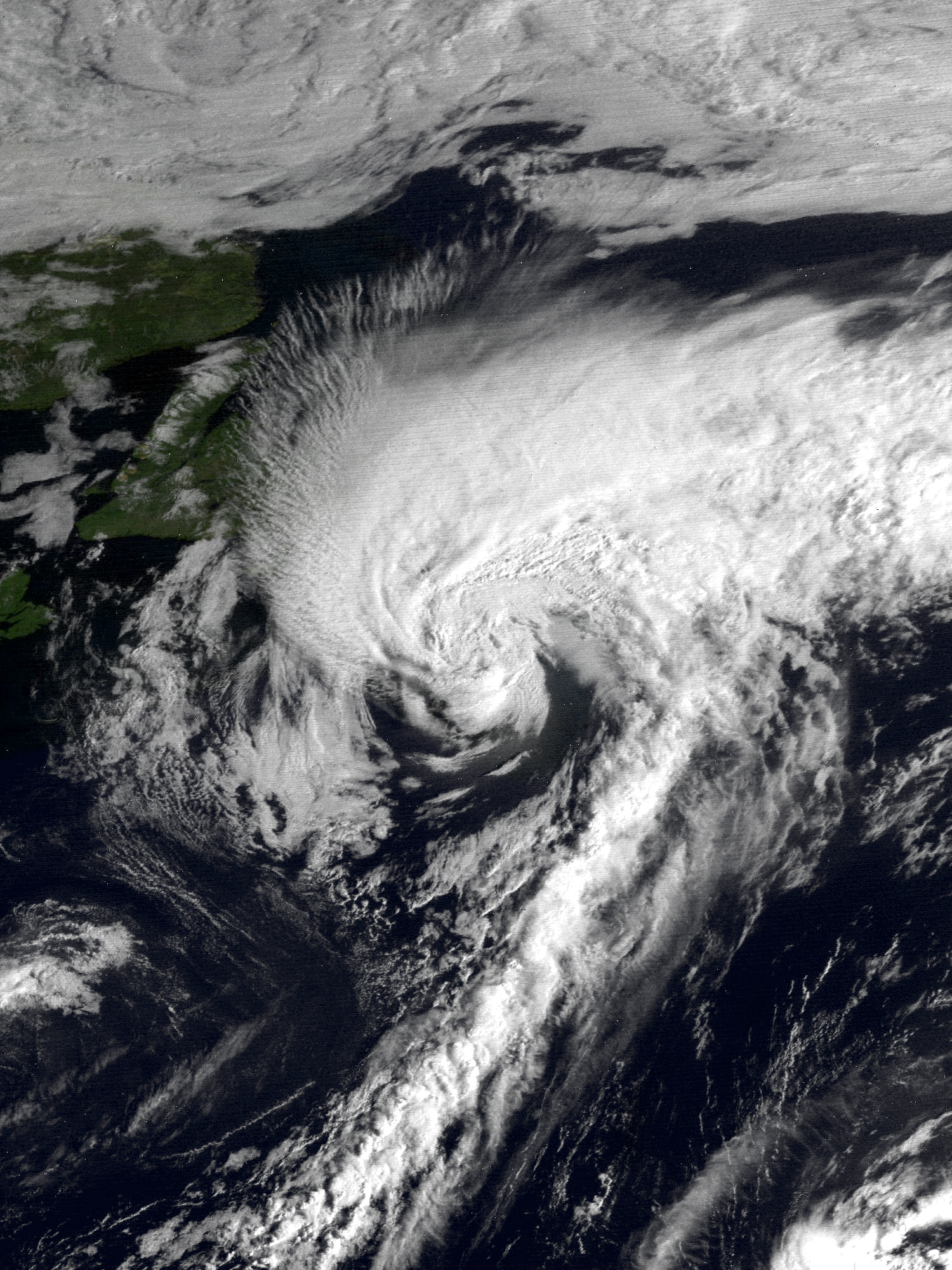
- Duration: September 1 – September 8
- Peak intensity: 80 mph (130 km/h) (1-min); 993 mbar (hPa)

On August 28, a tropical wave emerged into the Atlantic off the west coast of Africa. At 00:00 UTC on September 1, the system developed into Tropical Depression Seven, while centered roughly midway between the Lesser Antilles and the west coast of Africa. Sixteen hours later, the National Hurricane Center initiated advisories on the depression. The depression tracked westward in the trade winds during the following three days, without any intensification. After curving northwestward an Air Force reconnaissance flight found little evidence of a closed circulation, while satellite imagery also showed a disorganized and elongated cloud pattern on September 4. As a result, it was determined that the depression degenerated into a tropical disturbance at 06:00 UTC on that day. However, the National Hurricane Center did not discontinue advisories until 22:00 UTC.

On September 5, satellite imagery suggested a surface circulation had developed, possibly due to interaction with a cold low. As a result, the system regenerated into a subtropical depression at 12:00 UTC on that day, while centered about 360 mi (580 km) southwest of Bermuda. Ten hours later, the National Hurricane Center resumed advisories on the subtropical depression. While the subtropical depression was curved northeastward, it strengthened and acquired tropical characteristics. At 00:00 UTC on September 7, the subtropical depression became Tropical Storm Georges. The storm continued to intensify while tracking northeastward and was upgraded to a hurricane about 24 hours after becoming a tropical storm. Simultaneously, Georges attained its peak intensity with winds of 80 mph (130 km/h) and a minimum pressure of 993 mbar (29.3 inHg). However, later on September 8, Georges transitioned into an extratropical cyclone near Cape Race, Newfoundland. While bypassing Newfoundland, Georges dropped light rainfall, with amounts under 1 in (25 mm) of precipitation.

=== Tropical Storm Danielle ===
- Tropical storm (SSHWS)
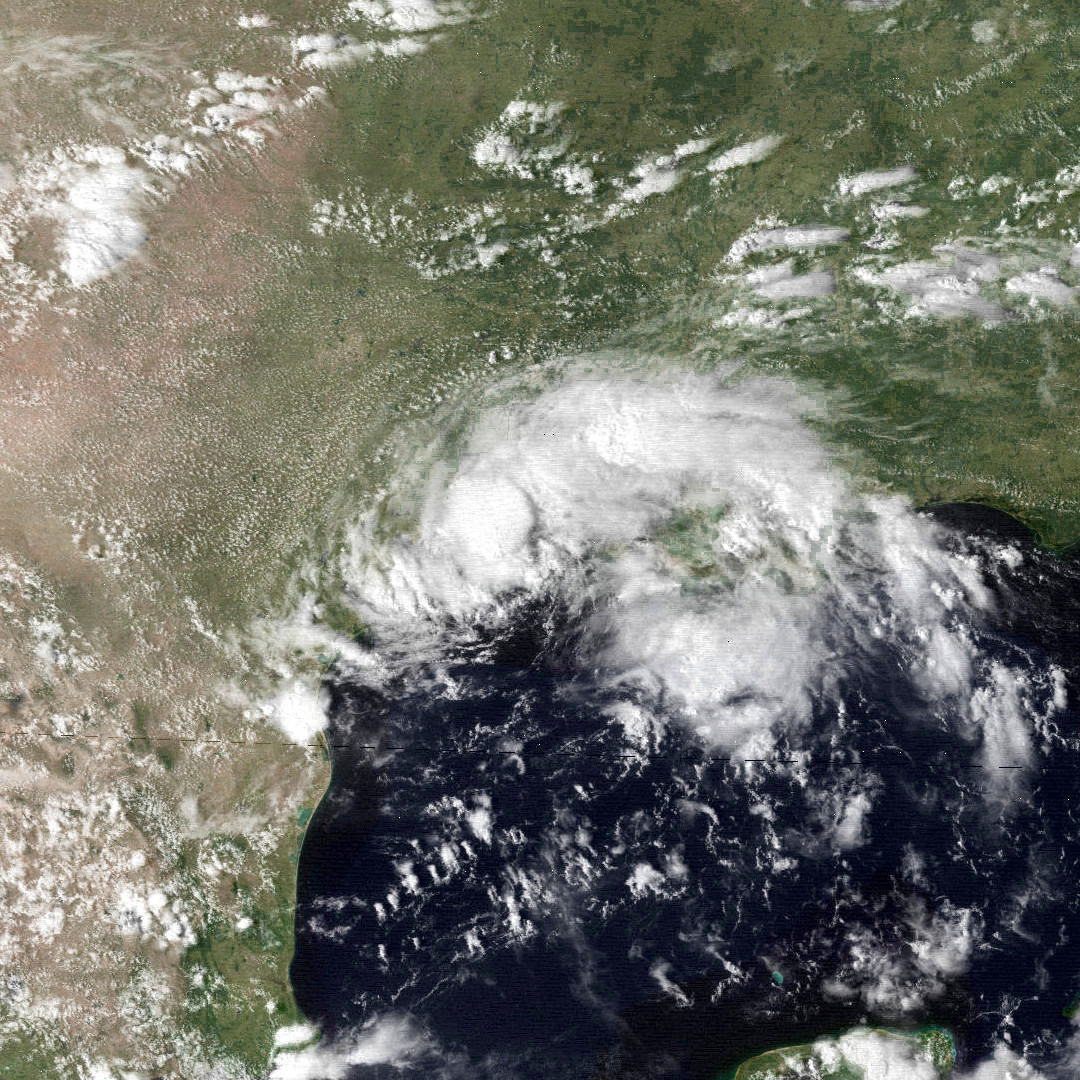
- Duration: September 4 – September 7
- Peak intensity: 60 mph (95 km/h) (1-min); 1004 mbar (hPa)

A tropical wave emerged into the Atlantic Ocean from the west coast of Africa on August 22. The system developed into Tropical Depression Six on August 25. However, the depression did not strengthen further, and about four days later, it degenerated back into a tropical wave. Tracking westward, the system crossed Florida and entered into the Gulf of Mexico on September 2. Two days later, the system developed into Tropical Depression Eight while offshore of Louisiana. The depression gradually strengthened and became Tropical Storm Danielle late on September 5. After peaking with winds of 60 mph (95 km/h), further intensification was halted, as Danielle soon made landfall in eastern Texas. Danielle steadily weakened inland and dissipated two days later.

A barge in the Gulf of Mexico capsized due to rough seas, sending 11 of the crewmen overboard; one person drowned as a result. Danielle produced widespread rainfall in Louisiana, though few areas reported more than 5 in (130 mm) of precipitation. Damage in that state was minimal. Rainfall was heavier in Texas, peaking at 18.29 in (465 mm). Much of the damage caused by the storm was as a result of flooding. In Port Arthur, twelve homes were damaged, while Interstate 10 was inundated by flood waters. One fatality occurred in Texas due to an automobile accident in Beaumont. Danielle also spawned five tornadoes in Texas, three of which collectively caused $277,500 in damage. Overall, Danielle caused two fatalities and at least $25 million in damage in Texas. Elsewhere, the storm dropped light rainfall in Oklahoma and Mississippi.

=== Hurricane Earl ===
- Category 1 hurricane (SSHWS)
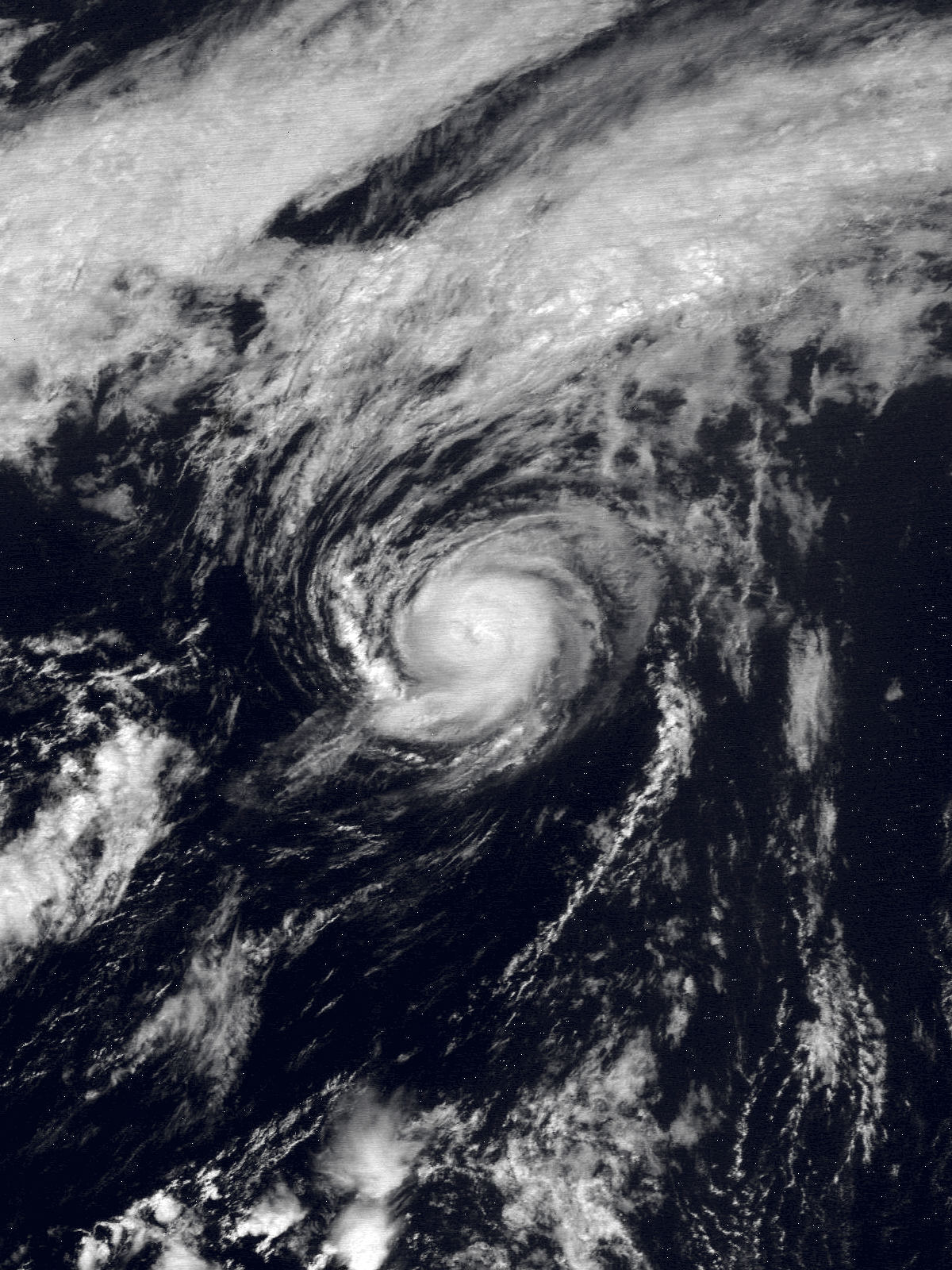
- Duration: September 4 – September 10
- Peak intensity: 75 mph (120 km/h) (1-min); 985 mbar (hPa)

Between September 2 and September 3, a tropical wave exited the west coast of Africa and entered the Atlantic Ocean. Satellite imagery indicated that the system had rapidly organized and was classified as a tropical depression on September 4. The depression quickly strengthened and was upgraded to Tropical Storm Earl later that day. Because convection associated with the storm waxed and waned significantly, Earl was operationally considered a tropical depression until September 6. On the following day, Earl curved north-northwestward and accelerated due to an upper-level low pressure trough in the central Atlantic Ocean.

After evidence of an eye feature appeared, Earl was upgraded to a hurricane on September 8. Six hours later, the storm attained its peak intensity with winds of 75 mph (120 km/h) and a minimum pressure of 985 mbar (29.1 inHg). Under the influence of an upper cold low, Earl began re-curving and accelerated to the northeast. By 12:00 UTC on September 10, Earl weakened to a tropical storm. Six hours later, Earl transitioned into an extratropical cyclone, while centered about halfway between the Azores and Greenland.

=== Hurricane Frances ===
- Category 3 hurricane (SSHWS)
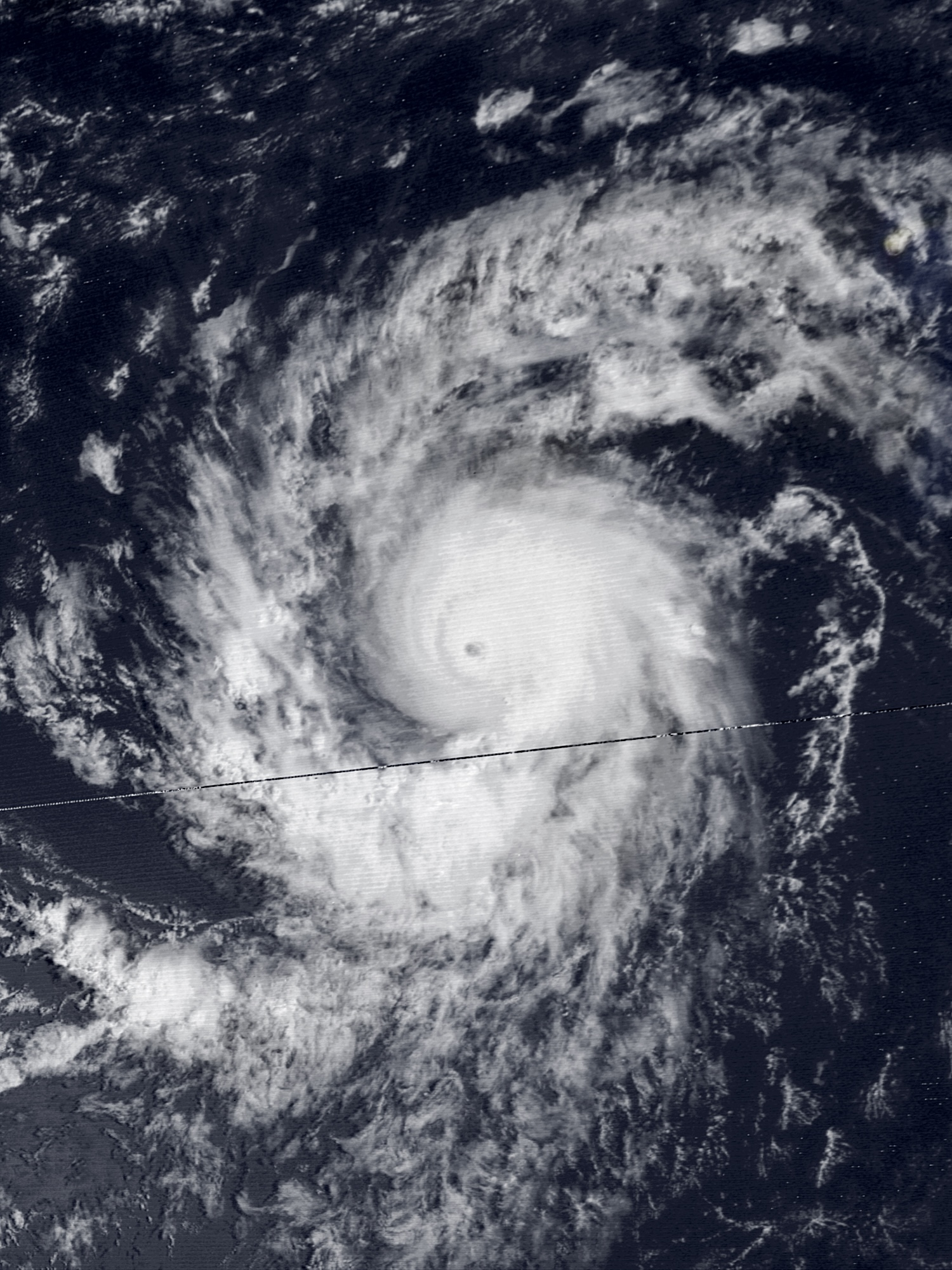
- Duration: September 6 – September 20
- Peak intensity: 115 mph (185 km/h) (1-min); 958 mbar (hPa)

A strong low pressure system moved off the African coast on September 5. By the following day, it developed into Tropical Depression Ten while a short distance off the west coast of Africa. About 18 hours later, the depression intensified into Tropical Storm Frances. The National Hurricane Center did not issue advisories until 16:00 UTC on September 7, at which time the system was already a tropical storm. By early on September 8, Frances had reached hurricane status, though it was not operationally upgraded until about 16 hours later. After becoming a hurricane, Frances began to rapidly strengthen, and became a Category 2 hurricane later that day. Early on September 9, the storm further intensified to a Category 3 hurricane. At 06:00 UTC on that day, Frances attained its peak intensity with winds of 115 mph (185 km/h) and a minimum pressure of 958 mbar (28.3 inHg).

After peak intensity, Frances began to weaken and was downgraded to a Category 2 hurricane later on September 9. Following day, the storm fluctuated between Category 2 and Category 1 hurricane strengthen. While curving northwestward on September 13, Frances remained steady in intensity as a Category 2 hurricane. Eventually, Frances re-curved northward, thereby avoiding any land. After minimal change in intensity, Frances weakened to a Category 1 hurricane while tracking northeastward on September 17. After briefly heading northward, the storm re-curved back to the northeast. Early on September 20, Frances weakened to a tropical storm, before merging with a frontal low while centered about halfway between Greenland and Iceland. Several ships reported tropical storm-force winds, but no impacts occurred on land except for minor squalls in Cape Verde.

=== Tropical Storm Hermine ===
- Tropical storm (SSHWS)
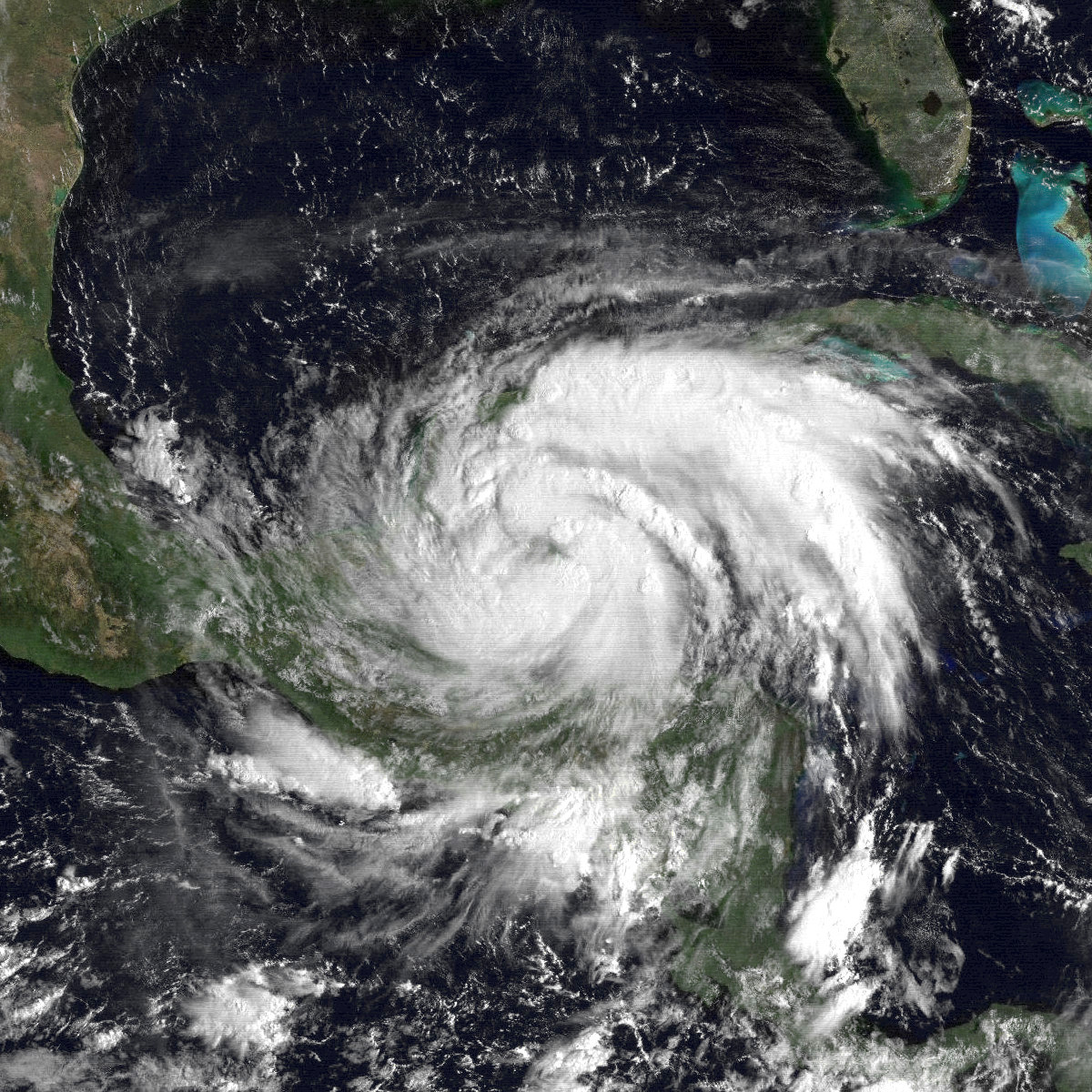
- Duration: September 20 – September 26
- Peak intensity: 70 mph (110 km/h) (1-min); 993 mbar (hPa)

A tropical wave exited the west coast of Africa on September 11 and tracked westward with minimal development until reaching the Caribbean Sea. By September 20, a low-level circulation had developed and the system was then classified as Tropical Depression Eleven, while located almost midway between Panama and Jamaica. While heading almost due westward, the depression steadily intensified, becoming Tropical Storm Hermine on September 21, 18 hours after forming. Later on September 21, the storm passed only 5 mi (10 km) offshore of Honduras. Hermine curved west-northwestward and nearly strengthened into a hurricane before landfall in northern British Honduras (present-day Belize) on September 22. After crossing the Yucatán Peninsula, Hermine emerged into the Bay of Campeche on the following day.

Once again, the storm intensified to near hurricane strength, though Hermine made landfall in Mexico near Coatzacoalcos, Veracruz, on September 24. After moving inland, the storm steadily weakened while tracking south-southwestward toward the Pacific Ocean. However, by early on September 26, Hermine dissipated near the southwestern coast of Mexico. In Mexico, many areas reported at least 10 in (250 mm) of precipitation, while a few locations experienced more than 30 in (760 mm) of rain. As a result of torrential rainfall, at least 30 fatalities occurred, with dozens more missing, and leaving 25,000 homeless. Additionally, landslides triggered by Hermine in Guatemala killed at least eight people.

=== Hurricane Ivan ===
- Category 2 hurricane (SSHWS)
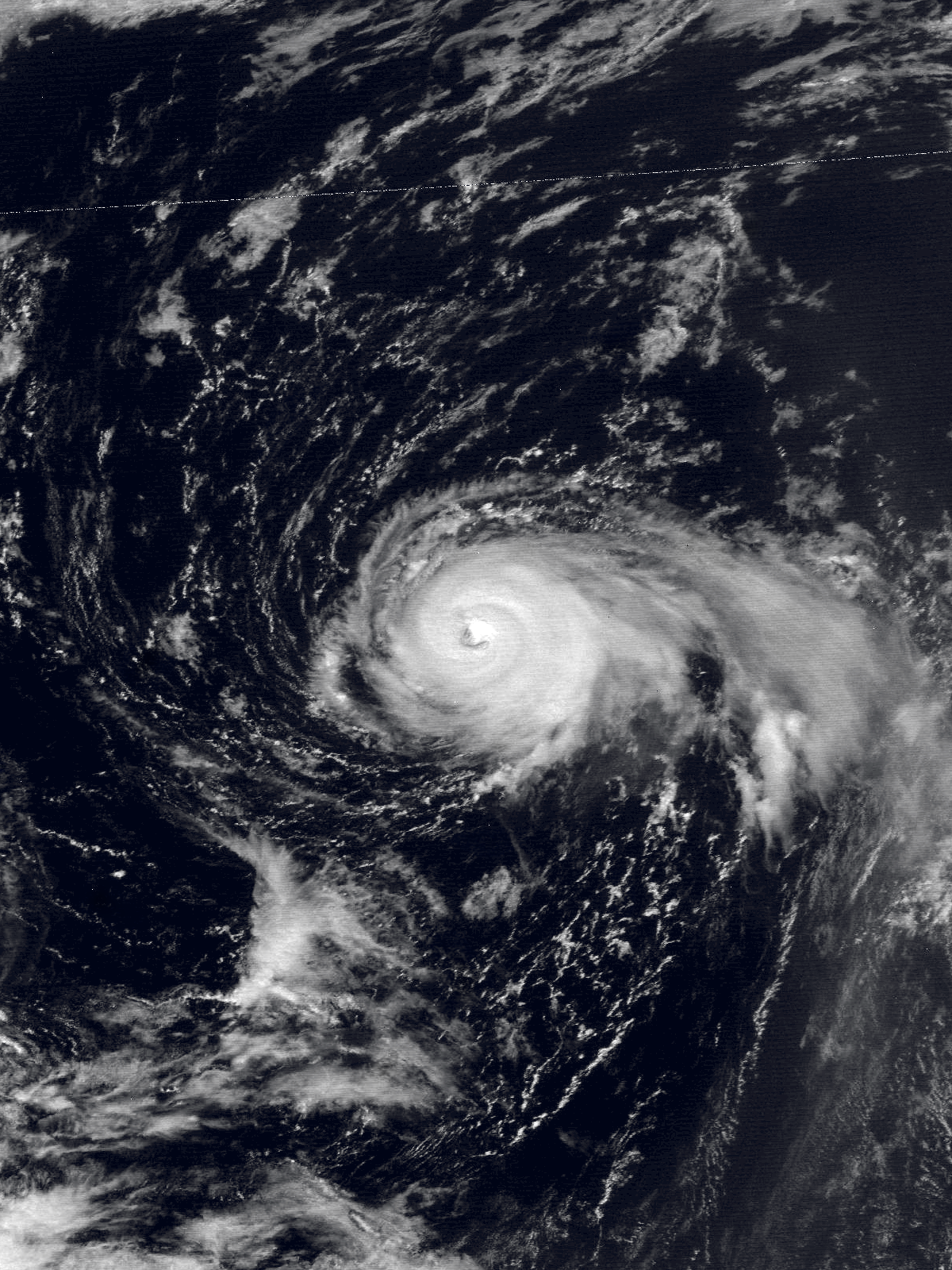
- Duration: October 4 – October 11
- Peak intensity: 105 mph (165 km/h) (1-min); 970 mbar (hPa)

In late September, a cold-core low persisted off the coast of Portugal, moving southwestward. The system gradually developed tropical characteristics as it turned northwestward and executed a loop near the Azores. Eventually, the system organized enough to be designated as a tropical depression on October 4, while just east of the Azores. Shortly thereafter, the depression intensified into Tropical Storm Ivan. However, the National Hurricane Center did not initiate advisories on Ivan until late on October 5. Ivan moved largely in tandem with the upper-level low above it, while its southwest movement was caused by a building ridge to its north. Late on October 5, an eye developed, and Ivan was upgraded to a hurricane on the following day.

It de-accelerated as the ridge to its north weakened, and 18 hours after becoming a hurricane, Ivan peaked with winds of 105 mph (165 km/h). Between October 6 and October 7, Ivan executed a tight loop, followed by a motion to the west-northwest. Ultimately, the intensity did not change for about 90 hours. During that time, the eye fluctuated occasionally as the convection waxed and waned. On October 9, Ivan turned to the north in advance of an approaching cold front and extratropical storm, while slowly weakening as it accelerated over cooler waters of the far northern Atlantic Ocean. By October 12, the cold front absorbed Ivan, which was about 665 mi (1,070 km) west of Ireland.

=== Unnumbered tropical depression ===
- Tropical depression (SSHWS)
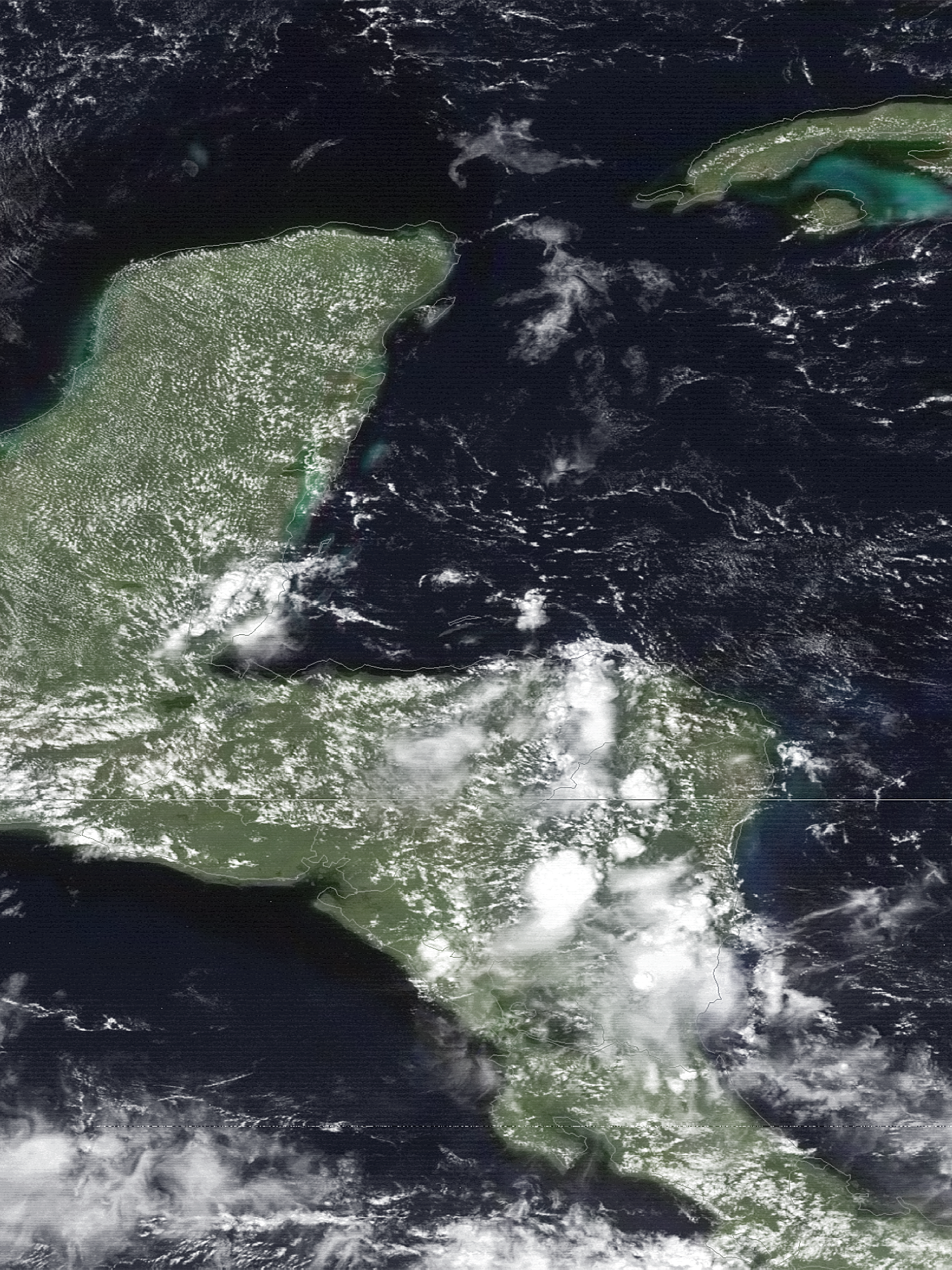
- Duration: October 16 – October 18
- Peak intensity: 30 mph (45 km/h) (1-min); 1008 mbar (hPa)

Early on October 16, a tropical depression developed over the northwestern Caribbean about 30 mi (50 km) northeast of Limón, Honduras. The depression moved westward and remained just offshore. By 00:00 UTC on October 18, the depression dissipated approximately 40 mi (65 km) east of Placencia, Belize.

=== Hurricane Jeanne ===
- Category 2 hurricane (SSHWS)
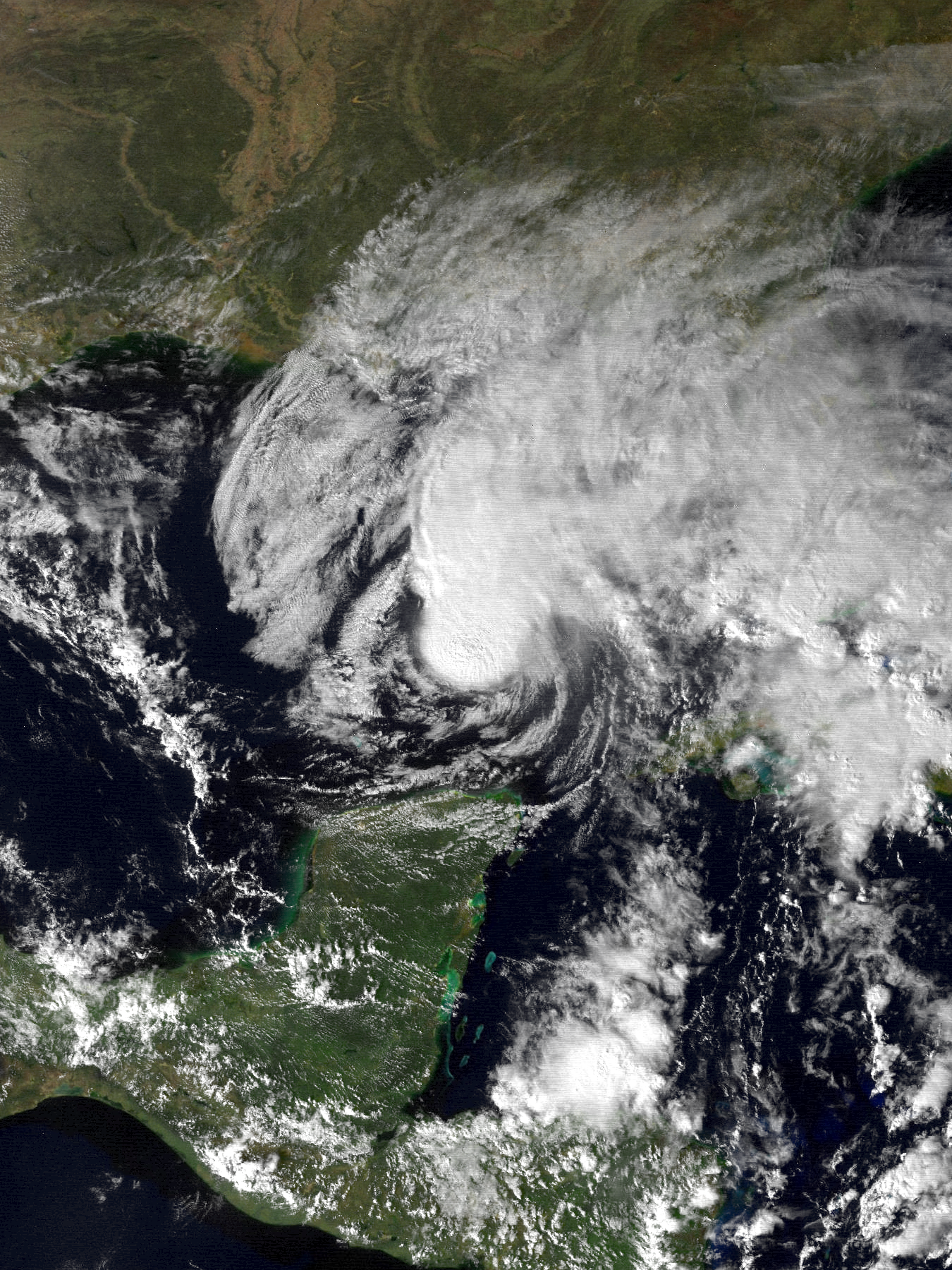
- Duration: November 8 – November 16
- Peak intensity: 100 mph (155 km/h) (1-min); 986 mbar (hPa)

An area of disturbed weather organized into a tropical depression late on November 8. The depression slowly intensified as it tracked north-northwestward into the northwestern Caribbean Sea. Shortly before entering the Yucatán Channel, the depression had strengthened enough to be upgraded to Tropical Storm Jeanne on November 9. Further intensification was still gradual in the Gulf of Mexico, though the rate of deepening accelerated as the storm began to curve westward. By November 11, Jeanne was upgraded to a hurricane while paralleling the northern coast of the Yucatán Peninsula. Early on the following day, Jeanne peaked as a 100 mph (155 km/h) Category 2 hurricane. Thereafter, Jeanne began to weaken due to dry air and was downgraded to a tropical storm 24 hours after peak intensity. The storm briefly tracked west-northwestward and then westward, before becoming nearly stationary in the western Gulf of Mexico.

Moving slowly and erratically, Jeanne weakened further and was downgraded to a tropical depression on November 15. The storm curved southward and completed a cyclonic loop, before being absorbed by a cold front on November 16. Fringe effects of Jeanne triggered a record-breaking 23.28 in (591 mm) of rain at Key West, Florida, within a 24-hour period. As a result of heavy precipitation, schools and numerous businesses closed, flights at Key West International Airport were grounded, and power outages and disruptions in telephone service occurred in Key West. Damage totaled about $1 million and one indirect death occurred due to a heart attack. In Texas, high tides caused flooding along much of the coast of the state, especially in Galveston. Offshore, several ships were caught off guard by the late season storm.

=== Tropical Depression Fourteen ===
- Tropical depression (SSHWS)
- Duration: November 12 – November 18
- Peak intensity: 35 mph (55 km/h) (1-min); 1007 mbar (hPa)

Tropical Depression Fourteen developed north of Panama on November 12. Steered northward by deep southerly flow southeast of Jeanne, the depression oscillated in organization while tracking west-northwestward. The cloud pattern between Jeanne and the depression briefly merged, with a line of thunderstorms moving across the Florida peninsula between the two systems. Westerly vertical wind shear increased on the depression in the process. By November 15, the depression reorganized its convective organization while making landfall in western Cuba early on November 16. Once again, vertical wind shear increased, causing convection to detach from the center of the depression.

Late on November 17, the depression was absorbed by an intense "winter type storm" that was moving across the Southeastern United States. Shortly thereafter, the remnants of the depression crossed Central and North Florida. While crossing Cuba, the depression dumped heavy rainfall. No other impact is known to have occurred on the island. The depression impact from both while tropical and a remnant system. In Key West, sustained winds of 30 mph (45 km/h) and gusts to 40 mph (65 km/h) were reported. Across much of Florida, light rainfall was reported, peaking at 4.81 in (122 mm) in Brooksville.

=== Hurricane Karl ===
- Category 1 hurricane (SSHWS)
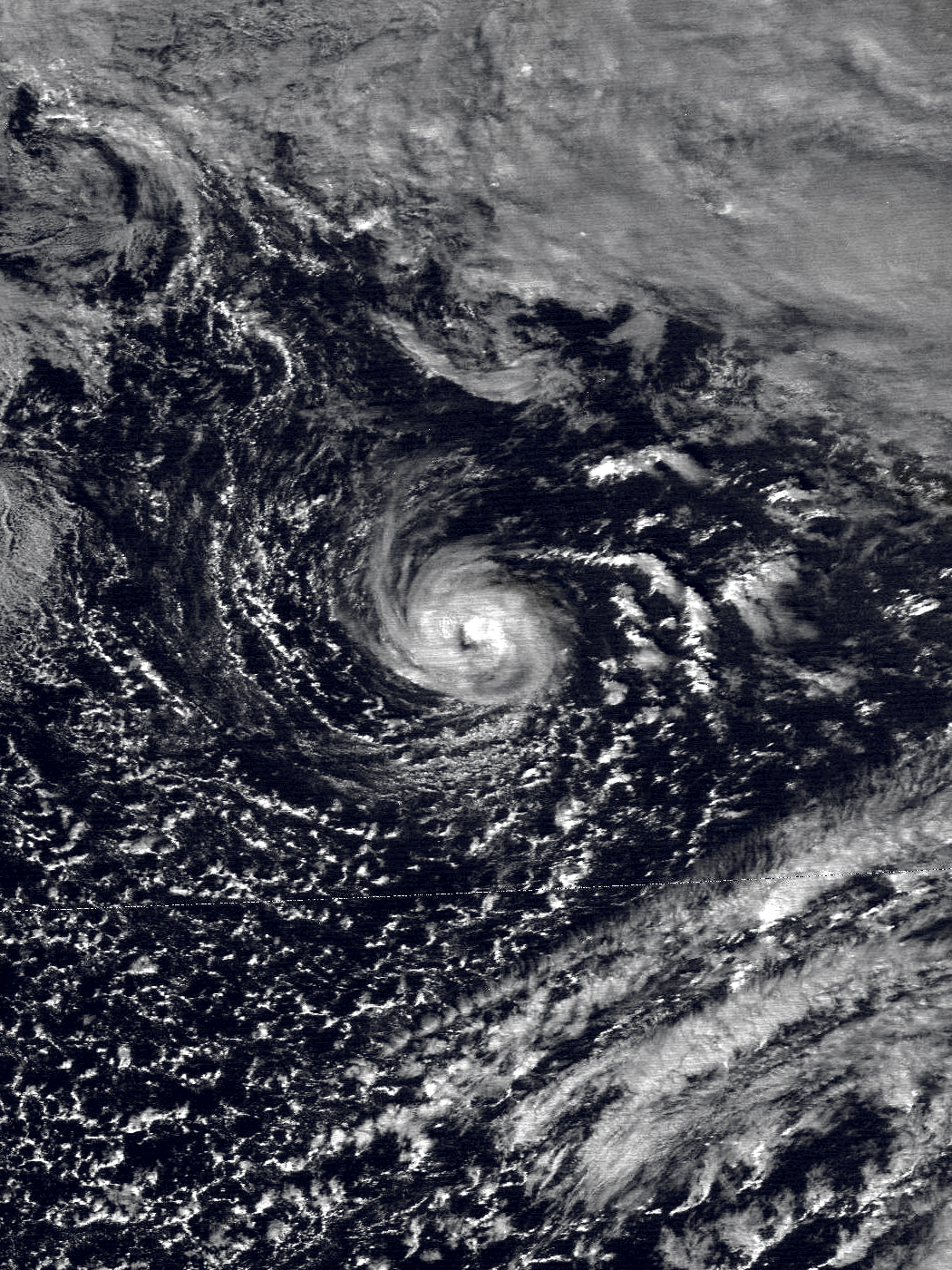
- Duration: November 25 – November 28
- Peak intensity: 85 mph (140 km/h) (1-min); 985 mbar (hPa)

On November 21, a low-pressure area formed along a frontal boundary near the southeastern United States. The system slowly strengthened and developed into a separate cyclone, aided by light wind shear. Following the development of circular convective mass close to the center of the low, it became a subtropical storm early on November 25 while centered about 825 mi (1,330 km) southeast of Cape Race, Newfoundland. Shortly thereafter, the storm executed a tight counterclockwise loop as it rotated within a larger, extratropical cyclone. Around 18:00 UTC, the subtropical storm intensified and acquired enough tropical characteristics to be designated as Hurricane Karl. The NHC noted that at the time, Karl was the easternmost hurricane during the last 10 days of the month of November.

The hurricane tracked eastward due to a strong trough moving eastward over the Atlantic and gradually strengthened, eventually attaining its peak intensity with winds of 85 mph (140 km/h) and a minimum barometric pressure of 985 mbar (hPa; 29.09 inHg). Thereafter, Karl curved northeastward because of the aforementioned trough and weakened slightly on November 27, with the eye becoming ragged and showing signs of deterioration while passing within 230 mi (370 km) of the Azores. Later that day, Karl turned north-northeastward around the periphery of the trough and merged with an approaching extratropical cyclone roughly halfway between Cape Race, Newfoundland and Spain.

== Storm names ==
The following list of names was used for named storms that formed in the North Atlantic in 1980. Most names were used for the first (and only in the case of Allen) time, except for Frances, which was previously used under the old naming convention.

- Allen
- Bonnie
- Charley
- Danielle
- Earl
- Frances
- Georges
- Hermine
- Ivan
- Jeanne
- Karl
- Lisa (unused)
- Mitch (unused)
- Nicole (unused)
- Otto (unused)
- Paula (unused)
- Richard (unused)
- Shary (unused)
- Tomas (unused)
- Virginie (unused)
- Walter (unused)

=== Retirement ===
In the spring of 1981, the World Meteorological Organization retired the name Allen from its rotating name lists due to its destructive impacts, and it will not be used again for another Atlantic hurricane. It was replaced with Andrew for the 1986 season.

== Season effects ==
This is a table of all of the storms that formed in the 1980 Atlantic hurricane season. It includes their name, duration, peak classification and intensities, areas affected, damage, and death totals. Deaths in parentheses are additional and indirect (an example of an indirect death would be a traffic accident), but were still related to that storm. Damage and deaths include totals while the storm was extratropical, a wave, or a low, and all of the damage figures are in 1980 USD.

1980 North Atlantic tropical cyclone season statistics
Storm name	Dates active	Storm category at peak intensity	Max 1-min wind mph (km/h)	Min. press. (mbar)	Areas affected	Damage (US$)	Deaths	Ref(s).
One	July 17 – 21	Tropical depression	30 (45)	1010	Texas, Louisiana	None	None	
Allen	August 1 –11	Category 5 hurricane	190 (305)	899	Windward Islands, Hispaniola, Cuba, Cayman Islands, Mexico, Florida, Texas, Louisiana	$1.57 billion	269	
Four	August 13 – 17	Tropical depression	35 (55)	1010	None	None	None	
Bonnie	August 14 – 19	Category 2 hurricane	100 (155)	975	None	None	None	
Charley	August 20 – 25	Category 1 hurricane	80 (130)	989	North Carolina	None	7	
Six	August 25 – 29	Tropical depression	35 (55)	1009	None	None	None	
Georges	September 1 – 8	Category 1 hurricane	80 (130)	993	Newfoundland	None	None	
Danielle	September 4 – 7	Tropical storm	60 (95)	1004	Texas, Louisiana, Oklahoma, Mississippi	$25 million	3	
Earl	September 4 – 10	Category 1 hurricane	75 (120)	985	None	None	None	
Frances	September 6 – 20	Category 3 hurricane	115 (185)	958	Cape Verde	None	None	
Hermine	September 20 – 26	Tropical storm	70 (110)	993	Central America (Belize), Mexico	Unknown	38	
Ivan	October 4 – 11	Category 2 hurricane	105 (165)	970	None	None	None	
Unnumbered	October 16 – 17	Tropical depression	30 (45)	1009	Honduras	None	None	
Jeanne	November 8 – 16	Category 2 hurricane	100 (155)	986	Florida, Gulf of Mexico, Gulf Coast of the United States	$1 million	(1)	
Fourteen	November 12 – 18	Tropical depression	35 (55)	1007	Cuba, Florida	Unknown	None	
Karl	November 25 – 28	Category 1 hurricane	85 (140)	985	None	None	None	
Season aggregates
16 systems	July 17 – November 28		190 (305)	899		$1.57 billion	317	

== See also ==
- 1980 Pacific hurricane season
- 1980 Pacific typhoon season
- 1980 North Indian Ocean cyclone season
- Australian cyclone seasons: 1979–80, 1980–81
- South Pacific cyclone seasons: 1979–80, 1980–81
- South-West Indian Ocean cyclone seasons: 1979–80, 1980–81
- South Atlantic tropical cyclone
- Mediterranean tropical-like cyclone
