= Tropical Storm Danielle (1980) =

Atlantic tropical storm in 1980

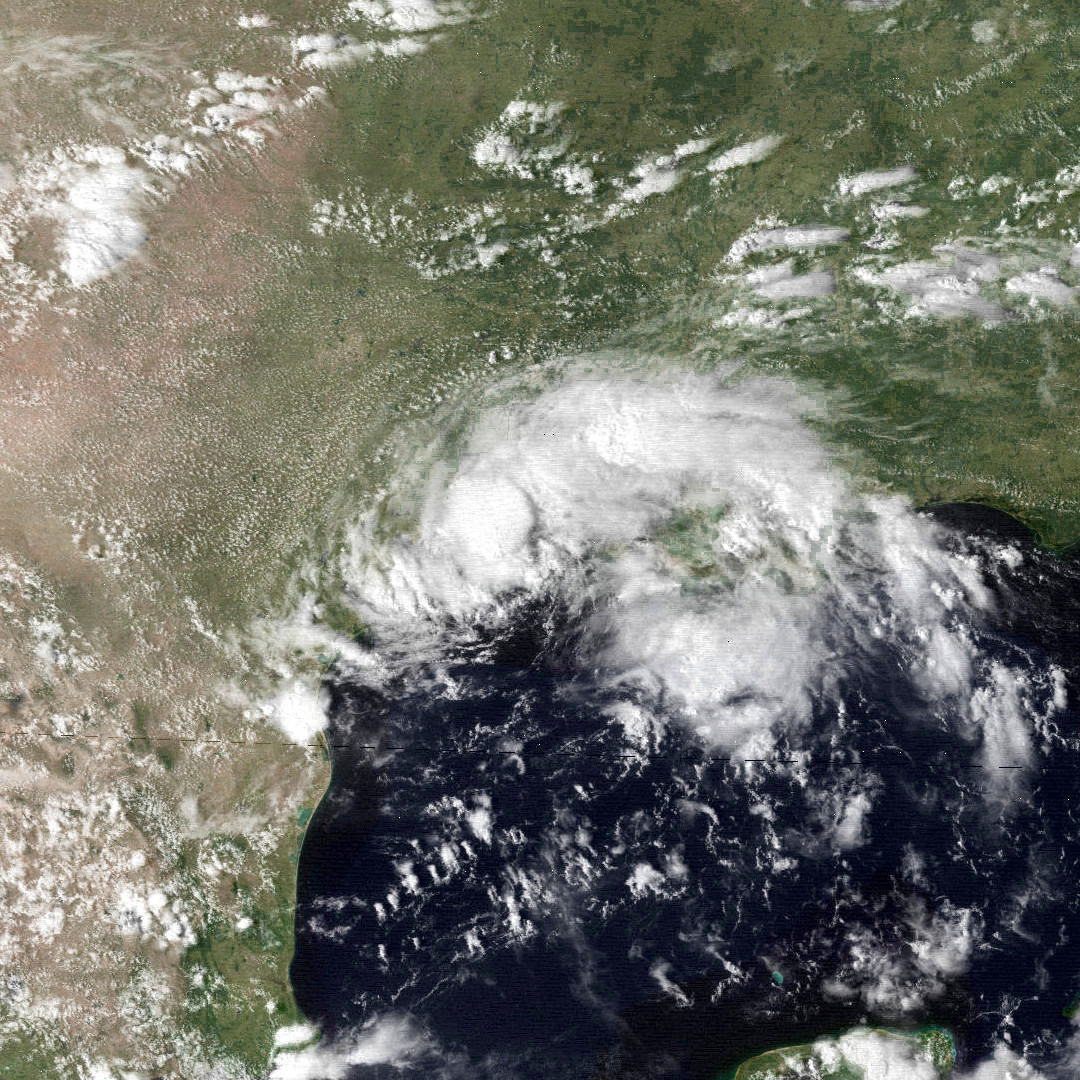
- Tropical Storm Danielle at peak intensity making landfall near Galveston on September 5

Meteorological history
- Formed: September 4, 1980
- Dissipated: September 7, 1980

Tropical storm
- 1-minute sustained (SSHWS/NWS)
- Highest winds: 60 mph (95 km/h)
- Lowest pressure: 1004 mbar (hPa); 29.65 inHg

Overall effects
- Fatalities: 3 direct
- Damage: $25 million (1980 USD)
- Areas affected: Texas, Louisiana, Mississippi, Oklahoma
- IBTrACS
- Part of the 1980 Atlantic hurricane season

Tropical Storm Danielle caused considerable flooding in the US state of Texas during September 1980. The eighth tropical cyclone and fourth named storm of the 1980 Atlantic hurricane season, Danielle developed from a tropical wave that emerged into the Atlantic Ocean from the west coast of Africa on August 22. Three days later, the tropical wave developed into a tropical depression. Four days later, the depression degenerated into a tropical wave. After tracking westward and entering the Gulf of Mexico, the system gradually developed, and became a tropical depression on September 4. The depression gradually strengthened and became Tropical Storm Danielle only hours before landfall in eastern Texas on September 5. Danielle steadily weakened inland and dissipated two days later.

Danielle produced widespread rainfall in Louisiana, though few areas reported more than 5 inches (130 mm) of precipitation. Rainfall was heavier in Texas, peaking at 18.29 inches (465 mm) in Nederland. Much of the damage caused by the storm was as a resulting of flooding. In Port Arthur, twelve homes were damaged, while Interstate 10 was inundated by flood waters. Danielle also spawned several tornadoes in Texas, though none effects from them are unknown. Outside of Texas and Louisiana, the storm also dropped light rainfall in Oklahoma and Mississippi. Overall, Danielle caused three fatalities and at least $25 million (1980 USD) in damage.

== Meteorological history ==
Map plotting the storm's track and intensity, according to the Saffir–Simpson scale Map key Saffir–Simpson scale Tropical depression (≤38 mph, ≤62 km/h) Tropical storm (39–73 mph, 63–118 km/h) Category 1 (74–95 mph, 119–153 km/h) Category 2 (96–110 mph, 154–177 km/h) Category 3 (111–129 mph, 178–208 km/h) Category 4 (130–156 mph, 209–251 km/h) Category 5 (≥157 mph, ≥252 km/h) Unknown Storm type Tropical cyclone Subtropical cyclone Extratropical cyclone, remnant low, tropical disturbance, or monsoon depression

A tropical wave emerged off the west coast of Africa on August 22 and tracked westward across the Atlantic Ocean. On August 25, the system developed into Tropical Depression Eight. After four days, the depression degenerated back into a tropical wave, which continued westward across the Atlantic. By September 2, the remnants of the depression then interacted with a mid-level low pressure system over southern Florida. As a result, a low-level circulation developed in the Gulf of Mexico as the system as a whole moved off Florida later that day. Organization continued and it is estimated that Tropical Depression Eight at 1800 UTC on September 4, while located about 120 miles (190 km) south of New Orleans, Louisiana. The National Hurricane Center began issuing advisories a few hours later. Furthermore, the National Hurricane Center later noted that strengthening was more likely if the depression remained offshore for a longer period of time.

Between 0600 and 1100 UTC, a barge known as the Glomar Tender II recorded sustained winds of 60 mph (95 km/h). However, this measurement was deemed to be "small scale[d]" and not representative of the storm's actual intensity. At 1700 UTC on September 5, the National Hurricane Center upgraded the depression to Tropical Storm Danielle, based on observations from reconnaissance aircraft and an oil rig. The oil rig, which was location near the coast of Louisiana, reported winds of 60 mph (95 km/h) and a minimum pressure of 1,004 mbar (29.6 inHg); this would later be considered the peak intensity of Danielle. A few hours later, Danielle made landfall near Galveston, Texas at the same intensity. The storm steadily weakened after moving inland and was downgraded to tropical depression by 1200 UTC on September 6. About four hours later, the National Hurricane Center discontinued advisories on Danielle. However, the storm did not dissipate until 1200 UTC on September 7, while located near Del Rio, Texas. The remnants of the storm continued westward for the next two days.

== Preparations and impact ==
=== Texas ===
As the storm was approaching, the National Weather Service issued flash flood watches from Freeport to Sabine Pass, Texas. Rainfall from the storm peaked at 18.29 inches (465 mm) in the town of Nederland. A 24-hour precipitation record of 17.16 inches (436 mm) was reported at the Southeast Texas Regional Airport in Beaumont. Due to heavy rainfall, an automobile accident in Beaumont resulted in one fatality. A police officer in Beaumont noted that almost every street in the city was flooded. The heavy rainfall resulted in considerable flash flooding in eastern Texas, causing residents to evacuate their homes. Flood waters also forced the shutdown of Interstate 10. According to a police spokesman, at least 60% of streets in Port Arthur were inundated by water. In Orange County, two people were injured in automobile accidents. Along Highway 124, a bayou overflowed its bank. Because there were numerous inundated streets, police barricaded roads in Beaumont, Bridge City, Orange, Vidor, and Port Arthur. A sewer system in Roscoe was also damaged by flood waters, leaving 1,500 residents without running water. In Port Arthur, twelve homes were reported flooded; one house in the Lakeview neighborhood had 1 foot (0.30 m) of water inside. Flood waters entered an oil pit at Port Neches, which sent at least 200 barrels of oil into the Neches River.

Danielle also produced tides 2 to 3 feet (0.61 to 0.91 m) above normal, causing minor beach erosion along the Texas coast. Several boats and docks on Lake Buchanan were damaged. A third fatality from the storm occurred when a fisherman's boat on Sabine Lake capsized, causing the man to die of a heart attack during rescue. Danielle spawned several tornadoes in the state of Texas, one of which caused an estimated $1,500 (1980 USD) in damage to a storage barn in Galveston County on the Bolivar Peninsula. Another touched down twice in Beaumont and overturned a mobile home at a mobile home park. After the storm, the American Red Cross opened storm shelters for residents forced out of their homes because of the flooding. Due to adverse conditions, "hundreds" were left without electricity in Beaumont, Silsbee, Kountze, Hamshire, and Fannett. In addition, then President of the United States Jimmy Carter declared Jefferson and Nolan counties as disaster area, allowing those areas to receive federal aid. Damage in Jefferson County alone totaled to $2.7 million (1980 USD). Overall, Danielle caused two fatalities and between $25 million and $50 million (1980 USD) in damage within the state of Texas.

=== Elsewhere ===
In the Gulf of Mexico, rough seas from Danielle caused a maintenance barge to capsize, washing all 11 crewmen overboard. A fatality occurred when one of the crewmen drowned, though the other ten were rescued by the United States Coast Guard. Additionally, the storm also caused a United States Coast Guard helicopter to crash into the sea due to high winds and lack of fuel, though all twelve crewmen survived. Offshore, a barge encountered winds of 58 mph (93 km/h) with gusts up to 92 mph (148 km/h) and light rainfall.

Danielle's effects on southern and eastern Louisiana was minimal. The state received moderate to heavy rainfall; there, the highest rainfall total there was 2.23 inches (57 mm) in Houma. Light rainfall was also reported in Oklahoma and Mississippi, with no areas reporting at least 3 inches (76 mm) of precipitation.

== See also ==
- List of Texas hurricanes (1980–present)
- Other tropical cyclones named Danielle
