= List of storms designated Two =

Multiple tropical cyclones have been assigned the numerical designation Two; this list only covers those that have not also formally received a name. Following the start of formal naming in the north Atlantic and the central and eastern Pacific, tropical depressions retain numerical designations.

In the north Atlantic Ocean:

- Hurricane Two (1841), an Atlantic hurricane also known as the Late Gale at St. Joseph
- Hurricane Two (1851), a Category 1 Atlantic hurricane that made landfall near Tampico, Mexico
- Hurricane Two (1852), a Category 2 Atlantic hurricane that made landfall in eastern Dominican Republic
- Hurricane Two (1872), a Category 2 Atlantic hurricane that headed near Bermuda and dissipated near Newfoundland
- Hurricane Two (1877), a Category 1 Atlantic hurricane that made landfall in Louisiana and then Fort Walton Beach, Florida
- Hurricane Two (1879), a Category 3 Atlantic hurricane also known as The Great Beaufort Hurricane
- Hurricane Two (1882), a Category 3 Atlantic hurricane also known as The Pensacola Hurricane of 1882
- Hurricane Two (1883), a Category 3 Atlantic hurricane that curved over the Atlantic Ocean and then moved eastward to England
- Hurricane Two (1884), a Category 3 Atlantic hurricane that curved to the northeast and dissipated west-southwest of Ireland
- Hurricane Two (1885), a Category 2 Atlantic hurricane that made landfall in the Bahamas and South Carolina
- Hurricane Two (1891), a Category 1 Atlantic hurricane that traveled northwest without any landfall
- Hurricane Two (1892), a Category 1 Atlantic hurricane that headed near Bermuda and struck Newfoundland
- Hurricane Two (1895), a Category 2 Atlantic hurricane that headed close to the Yucatán Peninsula and made landfall in southern Texas
- Hurricane Two (1896), a Category 3 Atlantic hurricane also known as Hurricane San Ramón of 1896
- Hurricane Two (1898), a Category 1 Atlantic hurricane that made landfall near the South Carolina-Georgia border
- Hurricane Two (1900), a Category 3 Atlantic hurricane that bypassed southeast of Bermuda with very minimal impact
- Hurricane Two (1902), a Category 1 Atlantic hurricane that made landfall near Corpus Christi, Texas
- Hurricane Two (1904), a Category 1 Atlantic hurricane that made landfall in Cedar Island, South Carolina
- Hurricane Two (1908), a Category 1 Atlantic hurricane that made landfall west of Cape Hatteras, North Carolina, and in eastern Long Island, New York
- Hurricane Two (1911), a Category 1 Atlantic hurricane that made landfall near the Alabama-Florida border
- Tropical Depression Two (1914), a potential tropical depression in 1914
- Hurricane Two (1921), a Category 1 Atlantic hurricane that made landfall just north of Tampico, Mexico, and caused the September 1921 San Antonio floods
- Hurricane Two (1922), a Category 3 Atlantic hurricane that passed very close to Barbuda and Bermuda
- Hurricane Two (1926), a Category 3 Atlantic hurricane also known as the 1926 Nova Scotia hurricane
- Hurricane Two (1928), a Category 1 Atlantic hurricane also known as the 1928 Haiti Hurricane
- Hurricane Two (1935), a Category 4 Atlantic hurricane that struck Newfoundland as "the worst gale in 36 years"
- Hurricane Two (1939), a Category 1 Atlantic hurricane that crossed the Bahamas and made landfall near Stuart and Apalachicola, Florida
- Hurricane Two (1940), a Category 2 Atlantic hurricane also known as the 1940 Louisiana Hurricane
- Hurricane Two (1942), a Category 1 Atlantic hurricane that made landfall near Crystal Beach, Texas
- Hurricane Two (1949), a Category 4 Atlantic hurricane also known as the 1949 Florida Hurricane
- Hurricane Two (1971), an unnamed Category 1 Atlantic hurricane that was not fully tropical
- Tropical Depression Two (1994), a depression that struck North Carolina
- Tropical Depression Two (1999), a short-lived depression that struck Veracruz
- Tropical Depression Two (2000), a depression that persisted in the main development region
- Tropical Depression Two (2001), a short-lived depression that did not threaten land
- Tropical Depression Two (2003), a short-lived depression that did not threaten land
- Tropical Depression Two (2010), struck southern Texas bringing limited flooding and storm surge

In the central and eastern Pacific Ocean:

- Tropical Depression Two-C (1983), a depression that formed well to the southwest of Hawaii
- Tropical Depression Two-E (1982), formed and persisted in the Gulf of Tehuantepec
- Tropical Depression Two-E (1986), a disorganized and short-lived depression that brought heavy rainfall to southern Mexico
- Tropical Depression Two-E (1998), formed to the southwest of Mexico
- Tropical Depression Two-C (2001), formed to the southeast of Hawaii
- Tropical Depression Two-E (2004), a depression that formed well to the southwest of Mexico
- Tropical Depression Two-E (2006), a depression that brought heavy rainfall to parts of Guerrero and Oaxaca
- Tropical Depression Two-E (2010), a depression that persisted briefly in the Gulf of Tehuantepec

In the northwestern Pacific Ocean:

- Tropical Storm 02W (1950), a tropical storm that struck Taiwan
- Tropical Storm 02W (1956), a tropical storm that struck Vietnam

== See also ==
- List of unnamed tropical cyclones

Preceded by One	Tropical cyclone numerical designations Two	Succeeded by Three
