= List of tropical cyclones designated Five =

Multiple tropical cyclones have been assigned the numerical designation Five; this list only covers those that have not also formally received a name. Following the start of formal naming in the north Atlantic and the central and eastern Pacific, tropical depressions retain numerical designations.

In the north Atlantic Ocean:

- Tropical Depression Five (1974), a depression that struck Texas, bringing heavy rainfall
- Tropical Depression Five (1986), formed in the tropical Atlantic and tracked away from land
- Tropical Depression Five (1988), a long-lived depression that formed in the eastern tropical Atlantic, degenerated, then briefly regenerated off the East Coast of the U.S.
- Tropical Depression Five (1991), formed in the tropical Atlantic and did not affect land
- Tropical Depression Five (2010), a short-lived depression whose remnants brought rainfall across the southern U.S.

In the central and eastern Pacific Ocean:

- Tropical Depression Five-E (1982), a short-lived depression that persisted in the Gulf of Tehuantepec
- Tropical Depression Five-E (1989), remained out to sea
- Tropical Depression Five-E (1991), struck Oaxaca, bringing significant rainfall
- Tropical Depression Five-E (1997), erratically moved westward
- Tropical Depression Five-E (2000), formed to the southwest of Mexico and did not affect land
- Tropical Depression Five-E (2007), a short-lived depression that did not affect land
- Tropical Depression Five-E (2008), struck Michoacán, bringing heavy and damaging rains

== See also ==
- List of unnamed tropical cyclones

| Preceded by Four | Tropical cyclone numerical designations Five | Succeeded by Six |
