= List of storms designated One =

Multiple tropical cyclones have been assigned the numerical designation One; this list only covers those that have not also formally received a name. Following the start of formal naming in the north Atlantic and the central and eastern Pacific, tropical depressions retain numerical designations.

In the north Atlantic Ocean:

- Hurricane One (1780), also known as the San Antonio Hurricane or the St. Lucia Hurricane
- Hurricane One (1851), a Category 1 Atlantic hurricane that made landfall in Medina County, Texas
- Hurricane One (1852), a Category 3 Atlantic hurricane also known as the Great Mobile Hurricane
- Hurricane One (1860), a Category 3 Atlantic hurricane that made landfall in Louisiana
- Hurricane One (1870), a Category 1 Atlantic hurricane also known as the Mobile Hurricane
- Hurricane One (1896), a Category 2 Atlantic hurricane that made landfall east of Pensacola, Florida
- Hurricane One (1897), a Category 2 Atlantic hurricane that was first observed near Cape Verde and meandered over the Atlantic Ocean
- Hurricane One (1898), a Category 1 Atlantic hurricane that made landfall in Hobe Sound, Florida
- Hurricane One (1900), a Category 4 Atlantic hurricane that devastated Galveston, Texas
- Tropical Storm One (1907), the strongest tropical storm of the 1907 Atlantic hurricane season in terms of wind speeds
- Hurricane One (1908), a Category 2 Atlantic hurricane also known as the 1908 March Hurricane
- Hurricane One (1913), a Category 1 Atlantic hurricane that made its final landfall in Padre Island, Texas
- Tropical Storm One (1914), the only tropical storm of the 1914 Atlantic hurricane season
- Hurricane One (1918), a Category 3 Atlantic hurricane also known as the 1918 Louisiana Hurricane
- Hurricane One (1920), a Category 2 Atlantic hurricane that also meandered over the Atlantic Ocean
- Hurricane One (1925), a Category 1 Atlantic hurricane that developed somewhat close to the East Coast and moved northeastward
- Hurricane One (1928), a Category 1 Atlantic hurricane also known as the 1928 Fort Pierce Hurricane
- Hurricane One (1929), a Category 1 Atlantic hurricane that made landfall near Matagorda Bay, Texas
- Hurricane One (1938), a Category 1 Atlantic hurricane that formed in January of that year
- Hurricane One (1943), a Category 2 Atlantic hurricane also known as the 1943 Surprise Hurricane
- Hurricane One (1944), a Category 1 Atlantic hurricane that passed through the Caribbean and took a turn to the northeast
- Tropical Depression One (1979), a tropical depression that brought severe flooding to Jamaica
- Tropical Depression One (1980), a tropical depression that struck Texas
- Tropical Depression One (1983), formed in the tropical Atlantic
- Tropical Depression One (1984)
- Tropical Depression One (1988), a disorganized and short-lived depression
- Tropical Depression One (1990), an early season tropical depression that caused minimal damages in Cuba and Florida
- Tropical Depression One (1992), a tropical depression that brought heavy rainfall to Cuba and Florida
- Tropical Depression One (1993), an early season depression that brought significant rainfall to the Yucatán Peninsula and Cuba
- Tropical Depression One (2000), a short-lived depression
- Tropical Depression One (2009), remained away from land

In the central and eastern Pacific Ocean:

- Hurricane One (1955), a Category 1 Pacific hurricane that meandered over the Pacific Ocean for about three days
- Hurricane One (1956), a Category 1 Pacific hurricane that meandered over the Pacific Ocean for about two days
- Tropical Depression One-C (1983), a short-lived depression that formed south of Hawaii
- Tropical Depression One-E (1988), meandered well southwest of Mexico
- Tropical Depression One-C (1994), passed south of Hawaii, becoming its ninth-wettest tropical cyclone
- Tropical Depression One-C (1997), formed well southwest of Hawaii
- Tropical Depression One-C (2004), tracked well south of Hawaii
- Tropical Depression One-E (2009), a short-lived depression whose remnants brought moderate rainfall to parts of Sinaloa, Nayarit, and Jalisco
- Tropical Depression One-E (2020), a short-lived depression that formed well southwest of Baja California Sur

In the northwest Pacific Ocean:

- Tropical Storm 01W (1954), an early season tropical storm that impacted the Philippines

In the southwest Indian Ocean:

- Moderate Tropical Storm 01 (2018), remained out to sea

In the Australian region:

- Tropical Cyclone 01U (2003), a long-lived cyclone that meandered over northwestern Australia
- Tropical Cyclone 01U (2007), an early-season cyclone that remained out to sea
- Tropical Cyclone 01U (2022), an early-season cyclone that remained out to sea

In the south Atlantic Ocean:

- Subtropical Depression #01-2015, monitored by the Brazilian Navy
- Subtropical Depression #01-2016, monitored by the Brazilian Navy
- Tropical Storm 01Q (2021), an unusual South Atlantic tropical storm that was informally classified by the NOAA
- Subtropical Depression #01-2021, monitored by the Brazilian Navy
- Subtropical Depression #01-2023, monitored by the Brazilian Navy

== See also ==
- List of unnamed tropical cyclones

Preceded by —	Tropical cyclone numerical designations One	Succeeded by Two
