= List of tropical cyclones designated Six =

Multiple tropical cyclones have been assigned the numerical designation Six; this list only covers those that have not also formally received a name. Following the start of formal naming in the north Atlantic and the central and eastern Pacific, tropical depressions retain numerical designations.

In the north Atlantic Ocean:

- Tropical Depression Six (1975), a tropical depression that brought significant rainfall to the southeastern United States
- Tropical Depression Six (1995), a tropical depression that struck Veracruz
- Tropical Depression Six (2003), a tropical depression that briefly persisted in the tropical Atlantic

In the central and eastern Pacific Ocean:

- Tropical Depression Six-E (1984)
- Tropical Depression Six-E (1990), formed to the southwest of Mexico
- Tropical Depression Six-E (1996), formed to the west-southwest of Mexico
- Tropical Depression Six-E (1999), remained out to sea
- Tropical Depression Six-E (2001), a disorganized tropical depression that formed well to the southeast of Hawaii
- Tropical Depression Six-E (2004), a short-lived tropical depression that remained out to sea
- Tropical Depression Six-E (2010), formed to the southwest of Mexico
- Tropical Depression Six-E (2020), a short-lived tropical depression that remained out to sea

In the northwestern Pacific Ocean:

- Tropical Storm 06W (1995), a tropical storm that impacted the Philippines

In the Australian Region:

- Tropical Cyclone 06U (1983), a cyclone that formed from the remnants of Cyclone Esther

== See also ==
- List of unnamed tropical cyclones

Preceded by Five	Tropical cyclone numerical designations Six	Succeeded by Seven
