= List of storms designated Three =

Multiple tropical cyclones have been assigned the numerical designation Three; this list only covers those that have not also formally received a name. Following the start of formal naming in the north Atlantic and the central and eastern Pacific, tropical depressions retain numerical designations.

In the north Atlantic Ocean:

- Hurricane Three (1891), a Category 3 hurricane that made landfall in Martinique
- Hurricane Three (1935), a Category 5 hurricane that made landfall in Florida with the lowest recorded barometric pressure in the United States
- Hurricane Three (1940), a Category 2 hurricane that made landfall in the South Carolina and Georgia Coast
- Tropical Depression Three (2019), formed and impacted the Bahamas

In the central and eastern Pacific Ocean:

- Tropical Depression Three-E (1980), formed and persisted to the south-southwest of Mexico
- Tropical Depression Three-E (1982), formed well to the west-southwest of Mexico
- Tropical Depression Three-C (1992), formed well to the southwest of Hawaii
- Tropical Depression Three-E (1993), a long-lived depression that tracked offshore of Mexico
- Tropical Depression Three-E (1997), did not affect land
- Tropical Depression Three-E (1999), formed to the southwest of Mexico
- Tropical Depression Three-E (2002), formed and tracked well away from land
- Tropical Depression Three-E (2007), formed to the southwest of Mexico
- Tropical Depression Three-C (2013), a short-lived depression that crossed into the West Pacific basin

In the northwestern Pacific Ocean:

- Tropical Storm 03W (1998), a tropical storm that remained out to sea

In the south-west Indian Ocean:

- Tropical Depression 03, meandered out to sea

== See also ==
- List of unnamed tropical cyclones

Preceded by Two	Tropical cyclone numerical designations Three	Succeeded by Four
