= List of tropical cyclones designated Four =

Multiple tropical cyclones have been assigned the numerical designation Four; this list only covers those that have not also formally received a name. Following the start of formal naming in the north Atlantic and the central and eastern Pacific, tropical depressions retain numerical designations.

In the north Atlantic Ocean:

- Tropical Storm Four (1954), a tropical storm that tracked along the U.S. East Coast
- Tropical Depression Four (1988), a short-lived depression that struck Florida
- Tropical Depression Four (2000), a disorganized depression that remained offshore from Florida
- Tropical Depression Four (2017), formed in the tropical Atlantic and did not affect land

In the central and eastern Pacific Ocean:

- Tropical Depression Four-E (1988), formed to the south of Baja California Sur
- Tropical Depression Four-E (1989), a relatively long-lived depression that tracked westward towards Hawaii
- Tropical Depression Four-C (1997), formed to the southeast of Hawaii
- Tropical Depression Four-E (1999), formed in the open Pacific and tracked westward
- Tropical Depression Four-E (2000), a short-lived depression that formed in the open Pacific
- Tropical Depression Four-C (2006), a meandering and short-lived depression that formed to the southwest of Hawaii
- Tropical Depression Four-E (2007), formed well to the southwest of Mexico
- Tropical Depression Four-E (2019), formed to the southwest of Mexico
- Tropical Depression Four-E (2020), a disorganized and short-lived depression that persisted to the southwest of Baja California Sur
- Tropical Depression Four-E (2023), a short-lived depression that formed to the southwest of Mexico

In the Australian Region:

- Tropical Cyclone 04U (1981), a tropical storm-equivalent cyclone that brushed the Northern Territory

== See also ==
- List of unnamed tropical cyclones

Preceded by Three	Tropical cyclone numerical designations Four	Succeeded by Five
