= 1980–81 South Pacific cyclone season =

Tropical cyclone season

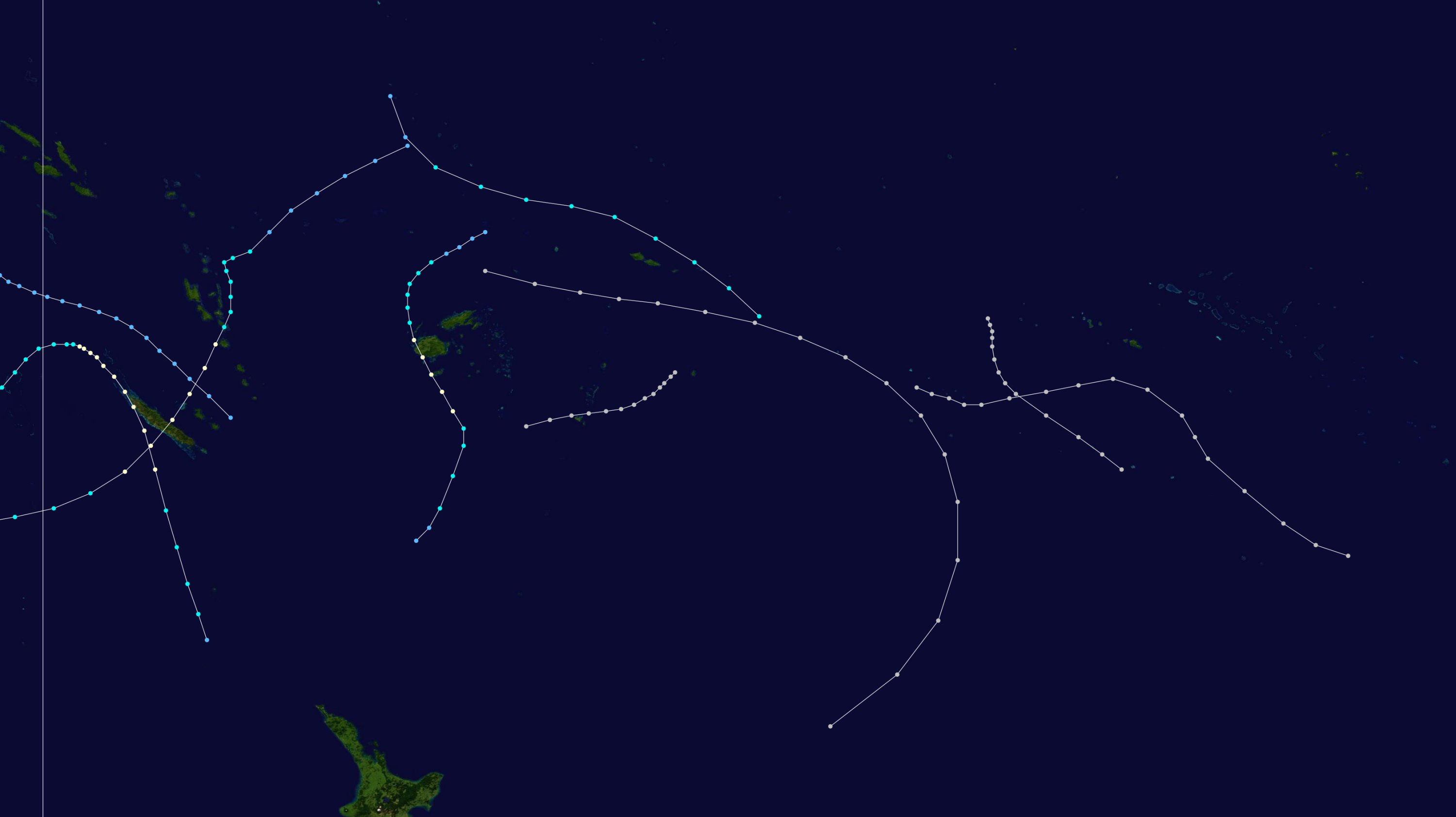
- Season summary map

Seasonal boundaries
- First system formed: November 27, 1980
- Last system dissipated: March 21, 1981

Strongest storm
- Name: Freda
  - Maximum winds: 150 km/h (90 mph) (10-minute sustained)
  - Lowest pressure: 955 hPa (mbar)

Seasonal statistics
- Total depressions: 12
- Tropical cyclones: 11
- Severe tropical cyclones: 4
- Total fatalities: Unknown
- Total damage: Unknown

Related articles
- 1980–81 South-West Indian Ocean cyclone season; 1980–81 Australian region cyclone season

The 1980–81 South Pacific cyclone season was an above-average season.

== Seasonal summary ==
This season marked the first time the United States Joint Typhoon Warning Center issued warnings and performed best track analysis on significant tropical cyclones in the Southern Hemisphere. It also marked the first time the naming list in the South Pacific basin have the name from South Pacific languages scattering with the Western name.

== Systems ==
=== Tropical Cyclone Diola ===
- Category 1 tropical cyclone (Australian scale)
- Tropical storm (SSHWS)
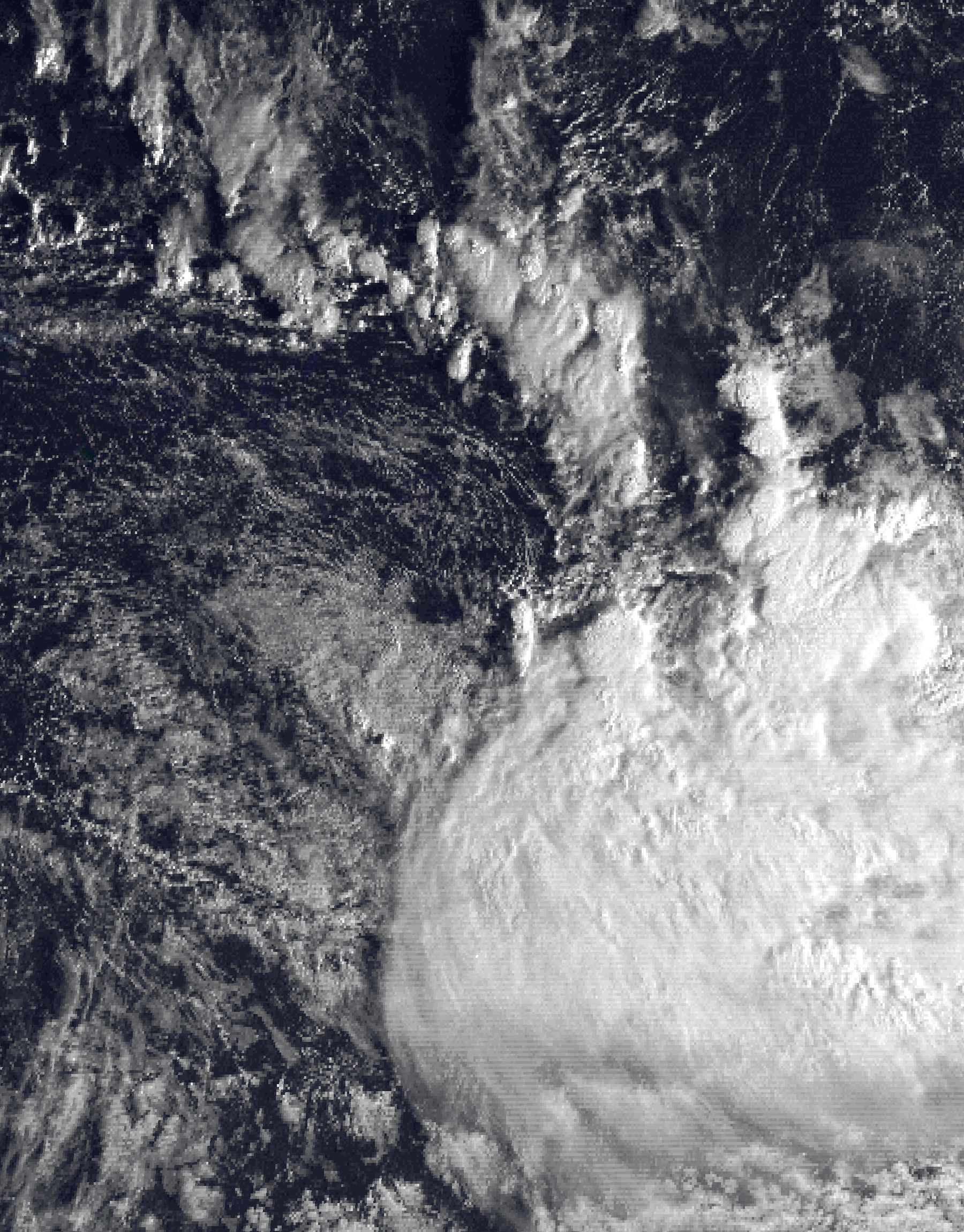
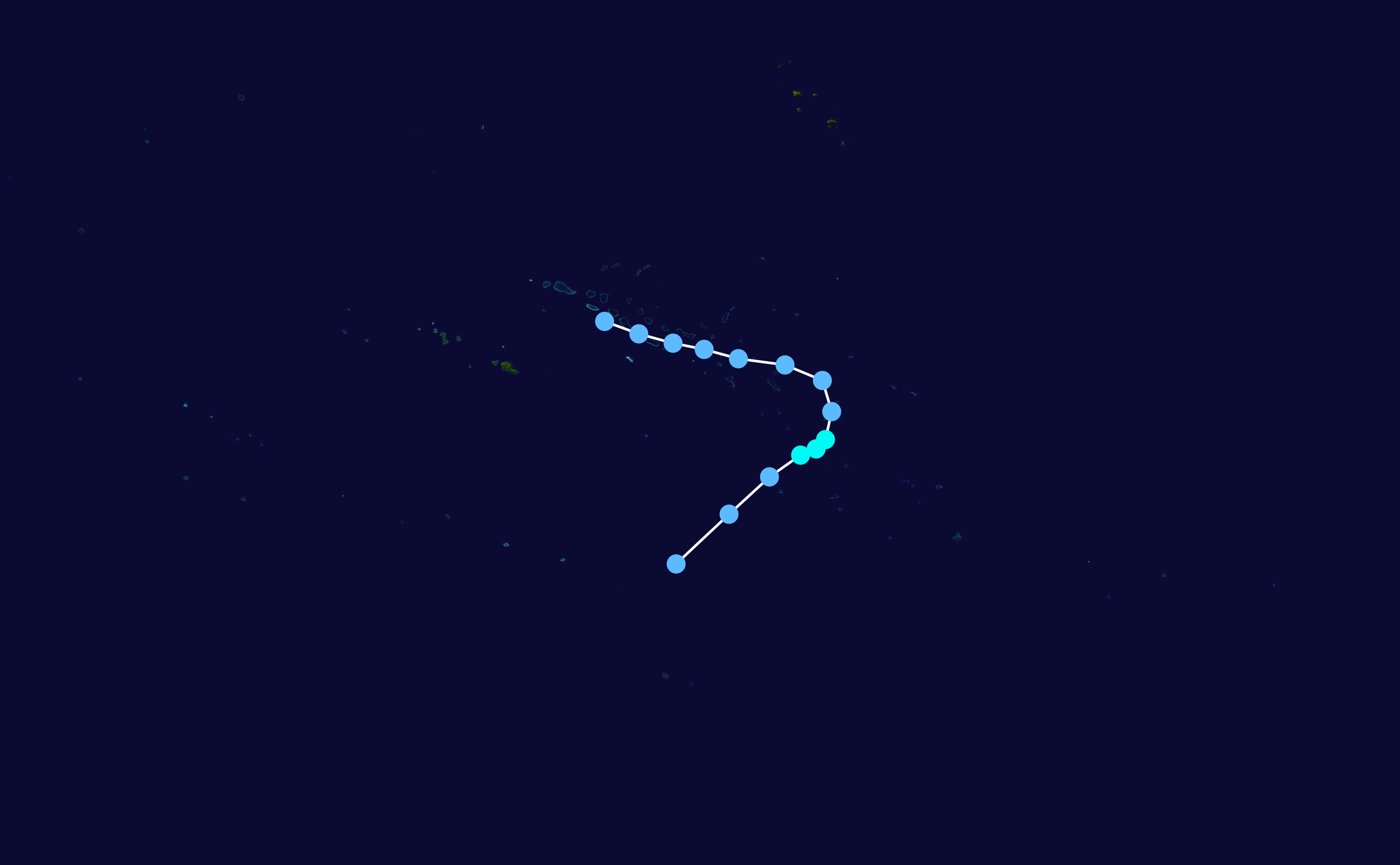
- Duration: November 27 – November 30
- Peak intensity: 65 km/h (40 mph) (10-min); 990 hPa (mbar)

Diola existed from November 27 to November 30.

=== Severe Tropical Cyclone Arthur ===
- Category 3 severe tropical cyclone (Australian scale)
- Category 1 tropical cyclone (SSHWS)
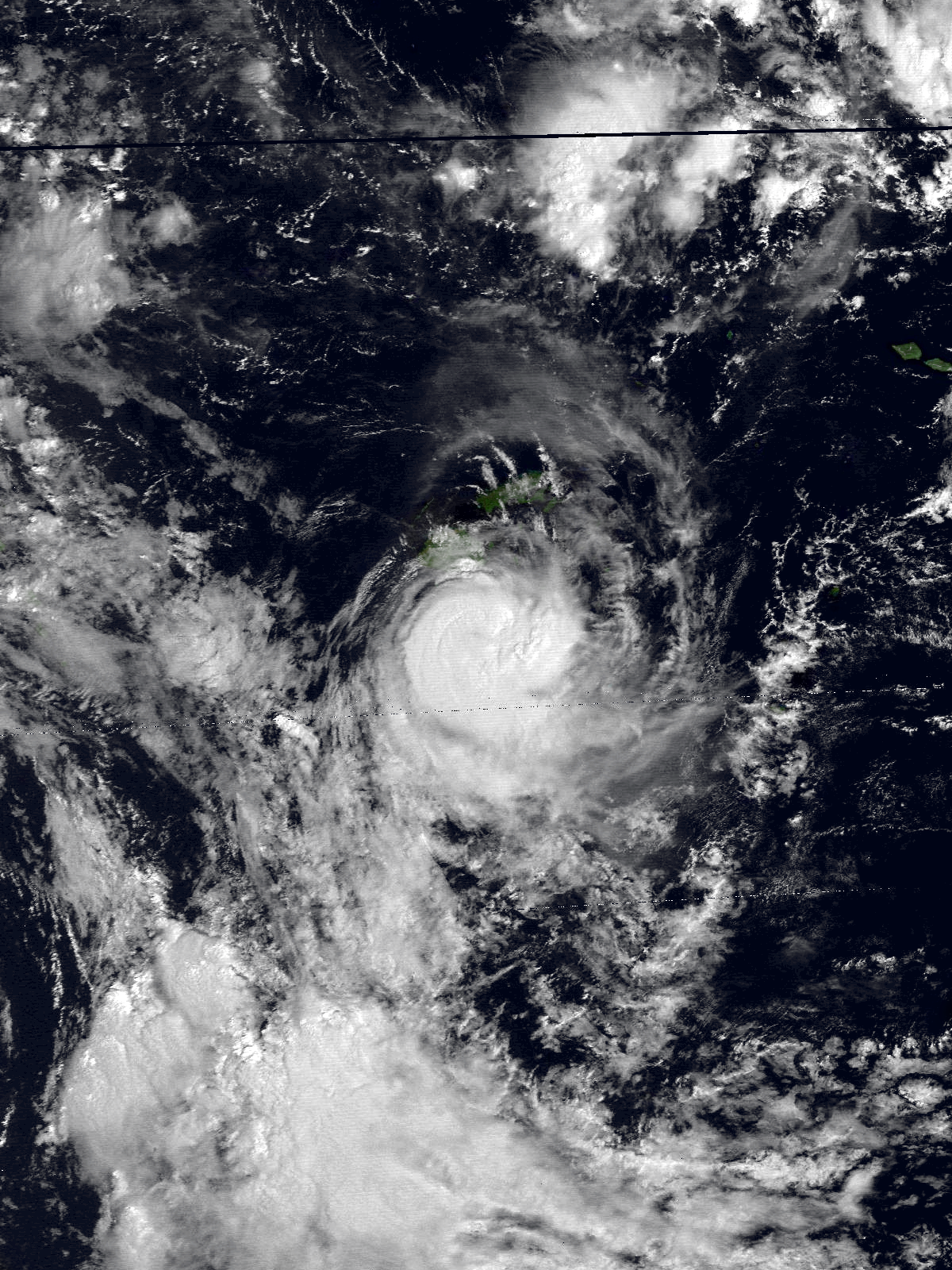
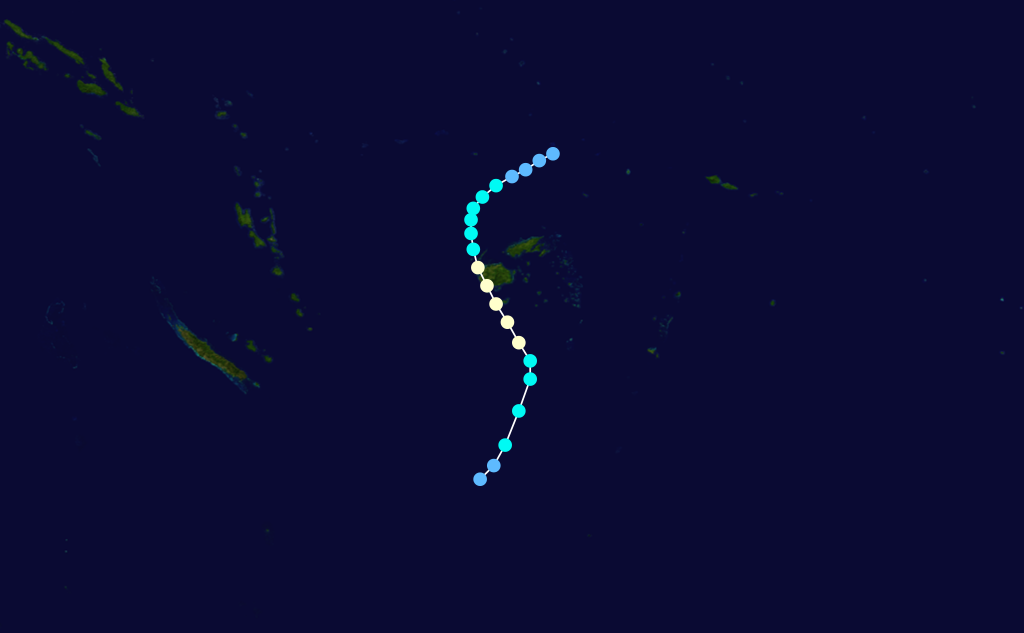
- Duration: January 11 – January 17
- Peak intensity: 130 km/h (80 mph) (10-min); 965 hPa (mbar)

Arthur existed from January 11 to January 17.

=== Tropical Cyclone Betsy ===
- Category 1 tropical cyclone (Australian scale)
- Tropical storm (SSHWS)
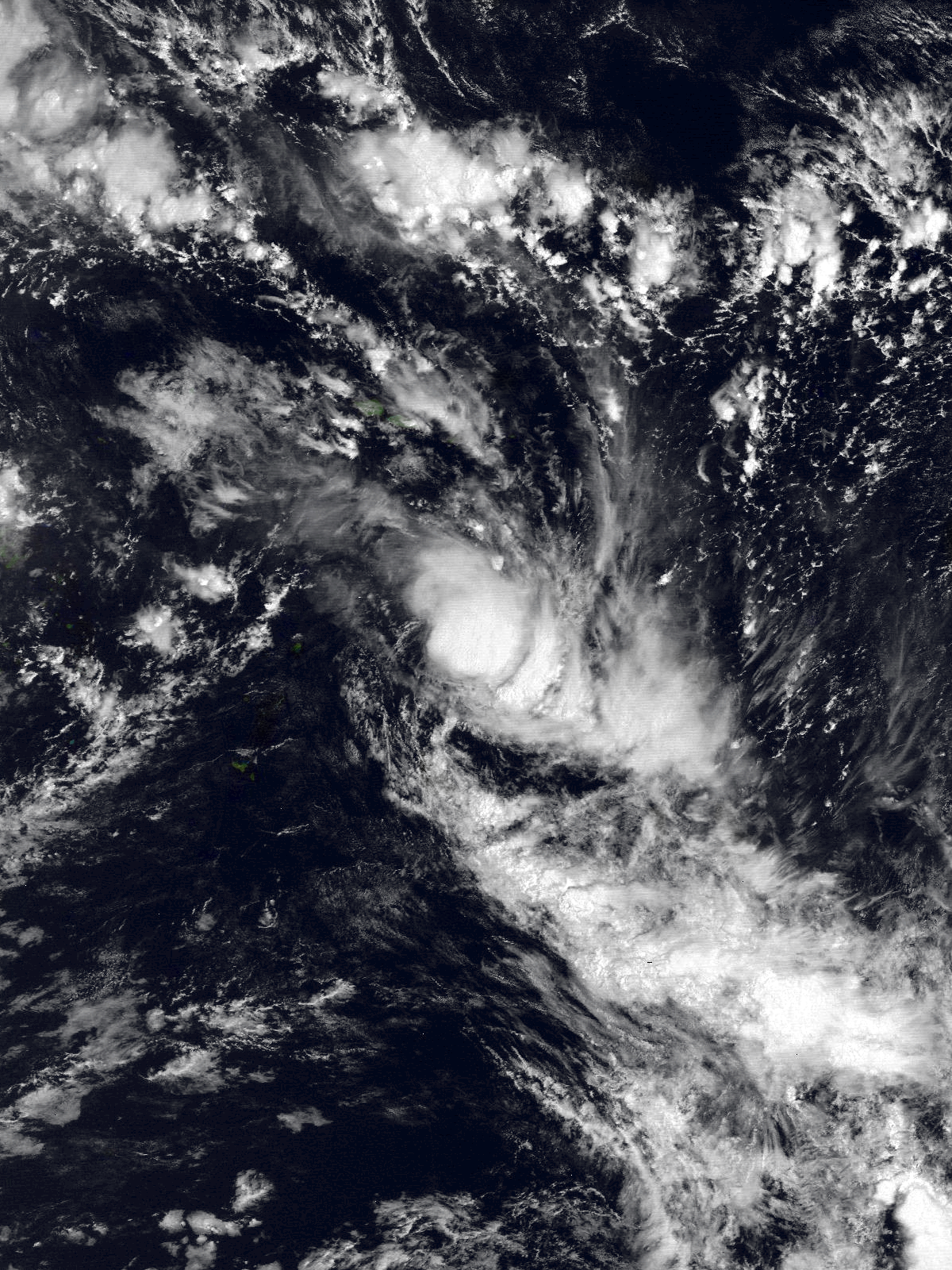
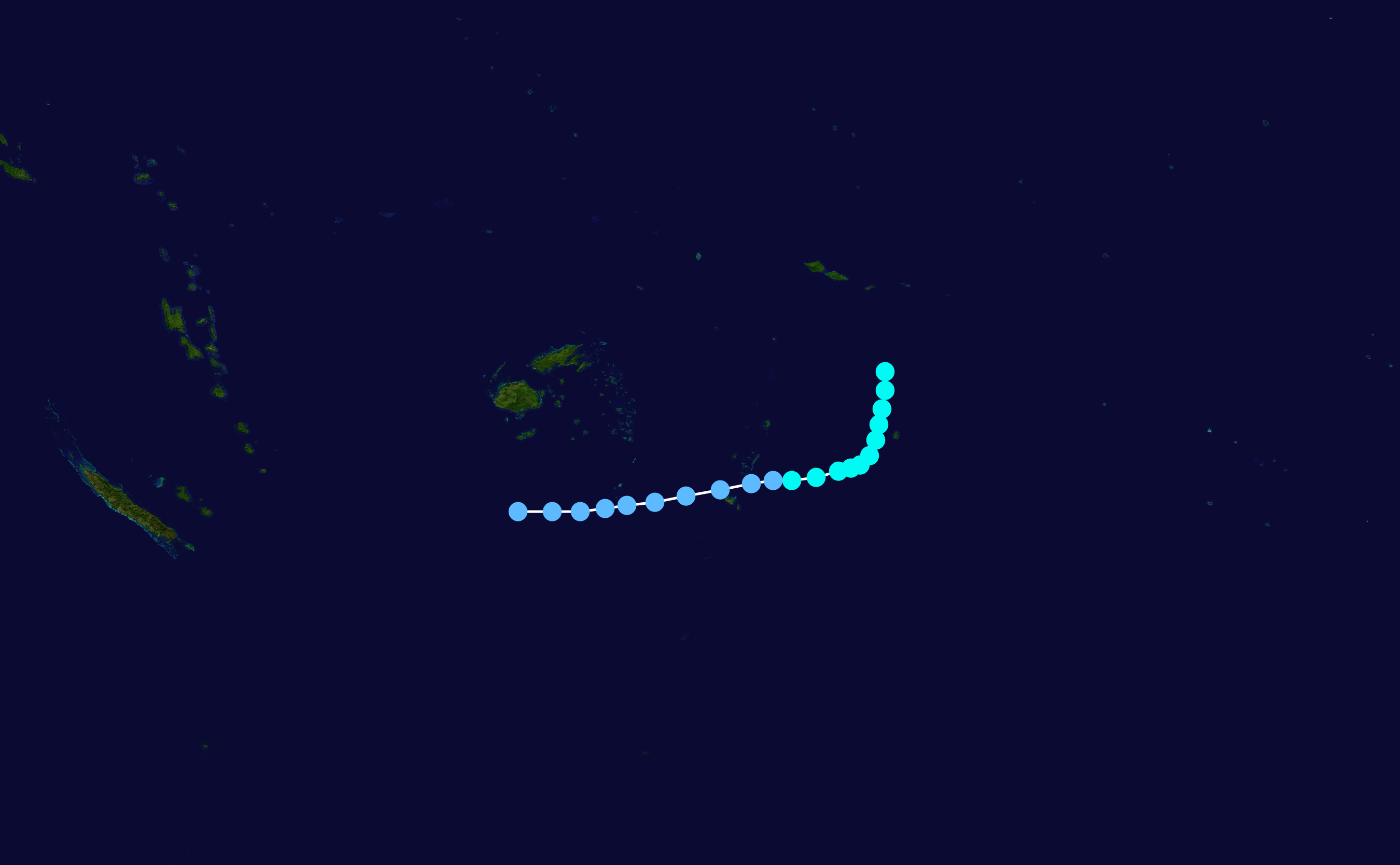
- Duration: January 30 – February 4
- Peak intensity: 65 km/h (40 mph) (10-min); 995 hPa (mbar)

Betsy existed from January 30 to February 4.

=== Severe Tropical Cyclone Cliff ===
- Category 3 severe tropical cyclone (Australian scale)
- Category 1 tropical cyclone (SSHWS)
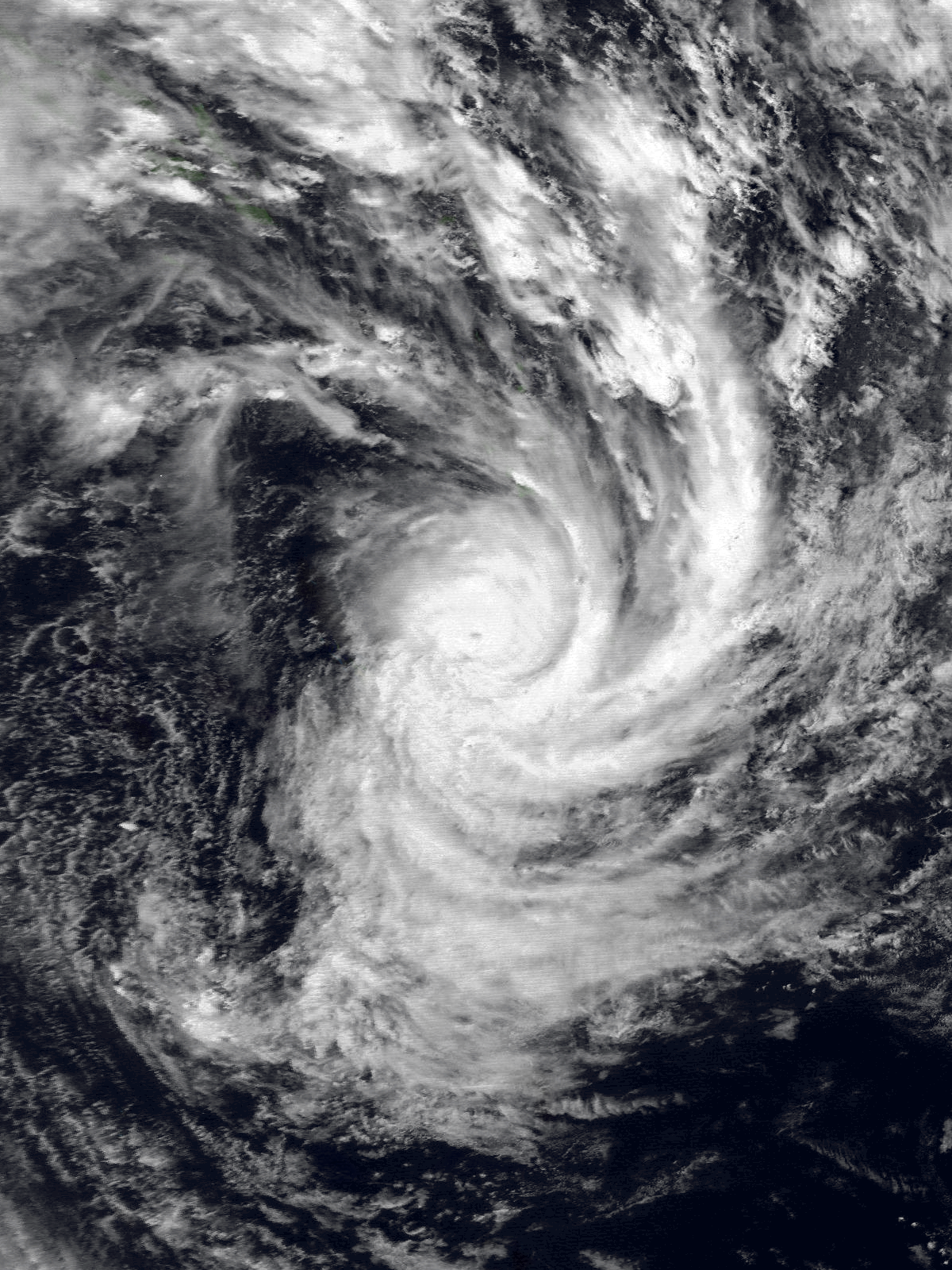
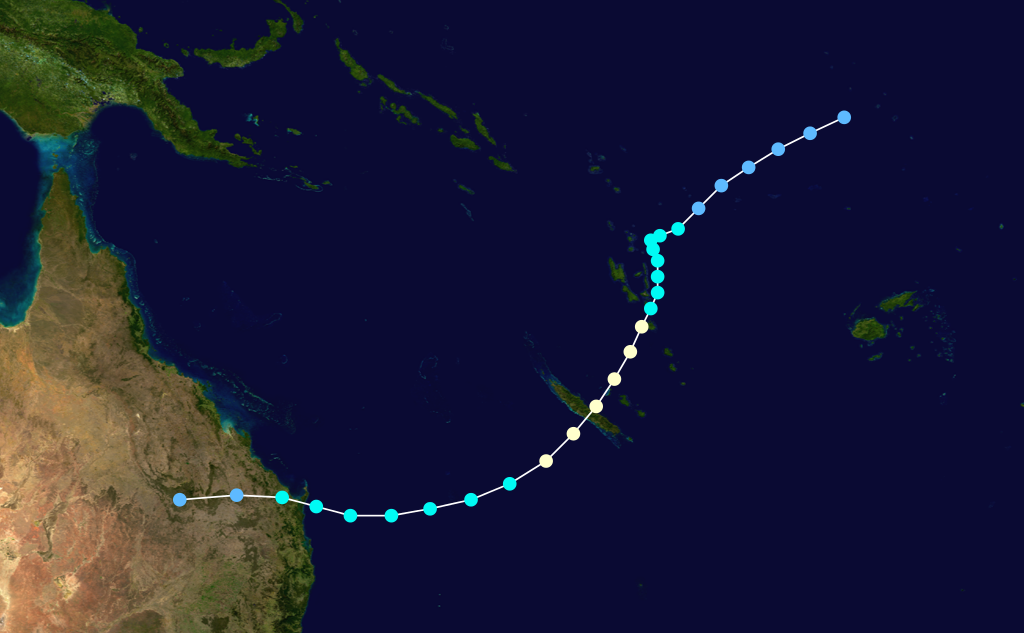
- Duration: February 9 – February 13 (Crossed 160°E)
- Peak intensity: 120 km/h (75 mph) (10-min); 975 hPa (mbar)

Cliff developed on February 9, near Vanua Lava, Vanuatu. The cyclone reached peak intensity on February 12, with an estimated central pressure of 975 hPa. It passed over New Caledonia at near peak intensity, with sustained winds 92 km/h (57 mph). After crossing into the Australian region, Cliff struck Queensland on February 14, making landfall near Bundaberg. The cyclone caused some crop and structural damages in South East Queensland, and beach erosion occurred on the Gold and Sunshine coasts. One man was drowned off the Gold Coast.

=== Tropical Cyclone SP198006 ===
- Category 2 tropical cyclone (Australian scale)
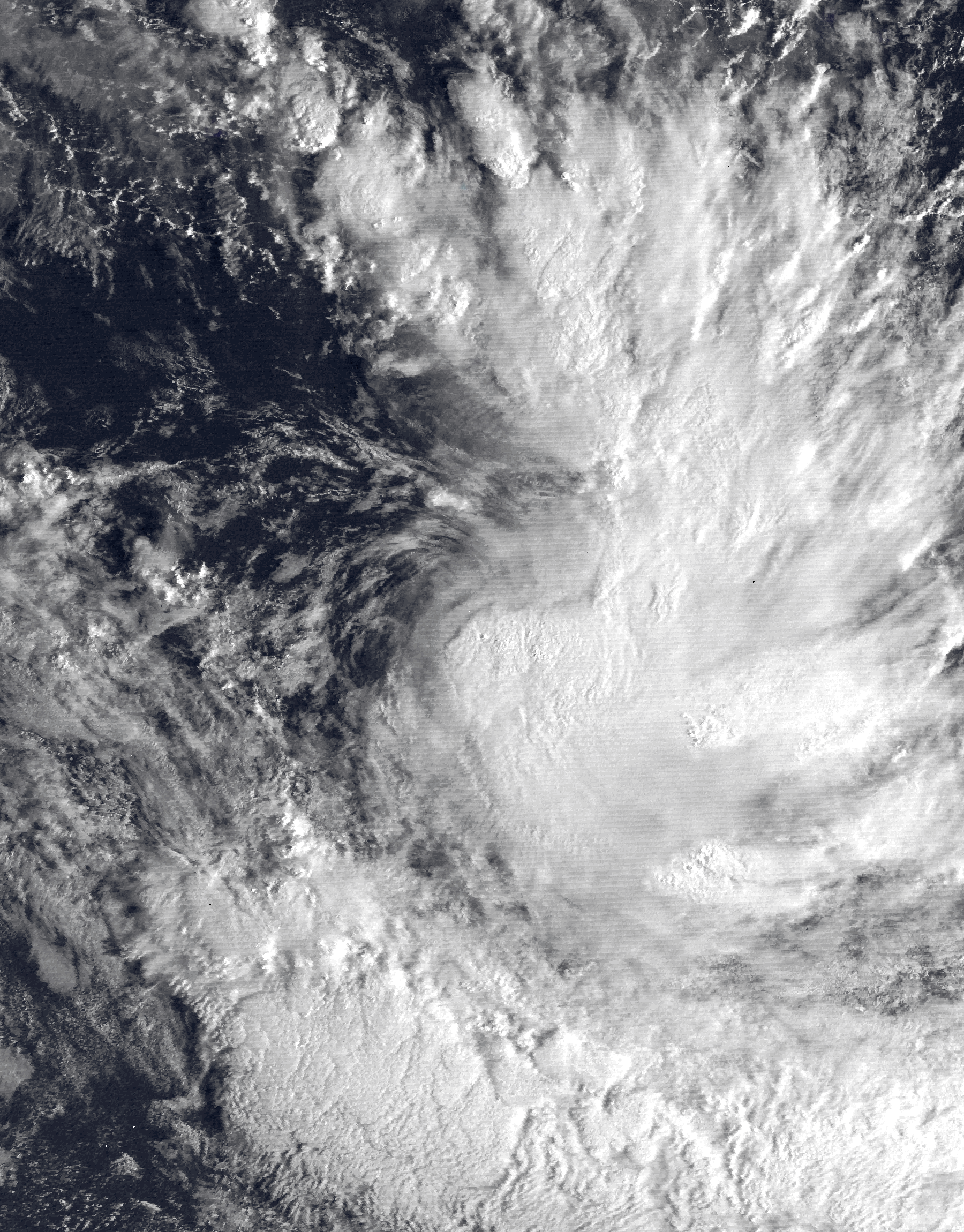
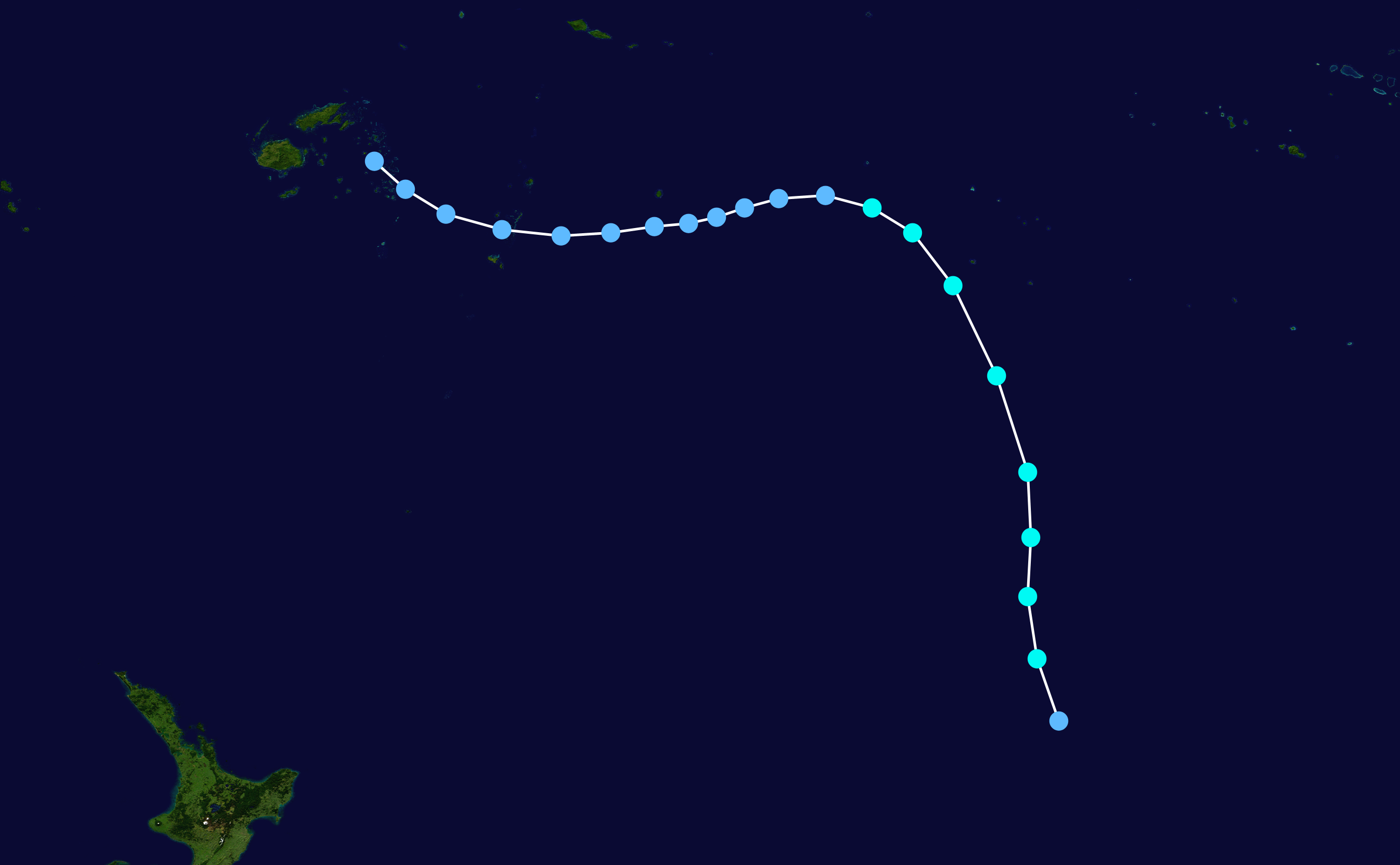
- Duration: February 16 – February 21
- Peak intensity: 95 km/h (60 mph) (10-min); 985 hPa (mbar)

This cyclone existed from February 16 to February 21.

=== Tropical Cyclone Daman ===
- Category 2 tropical cyclone (Australian scale)
- Tropical storm (SSHWS)
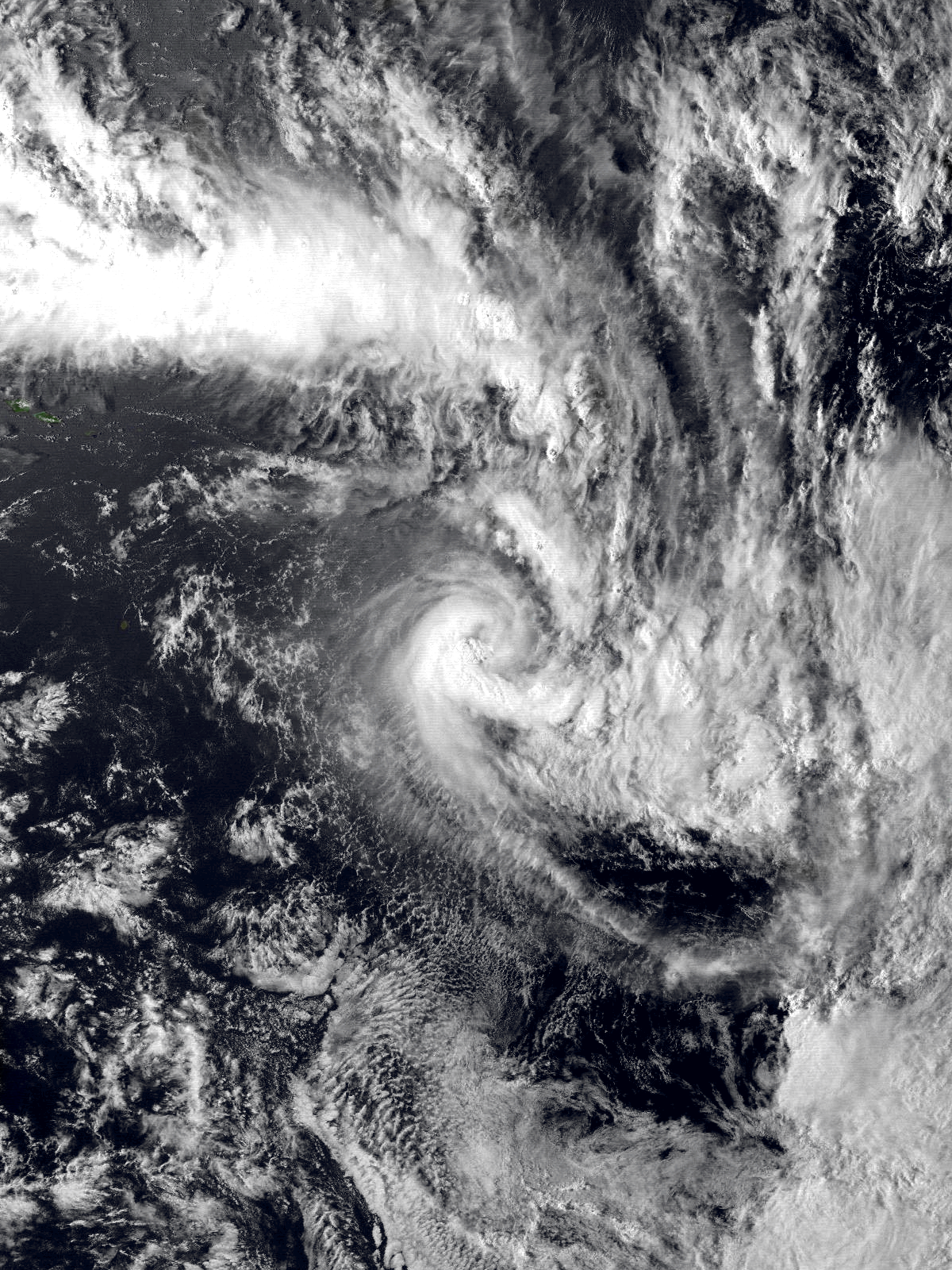
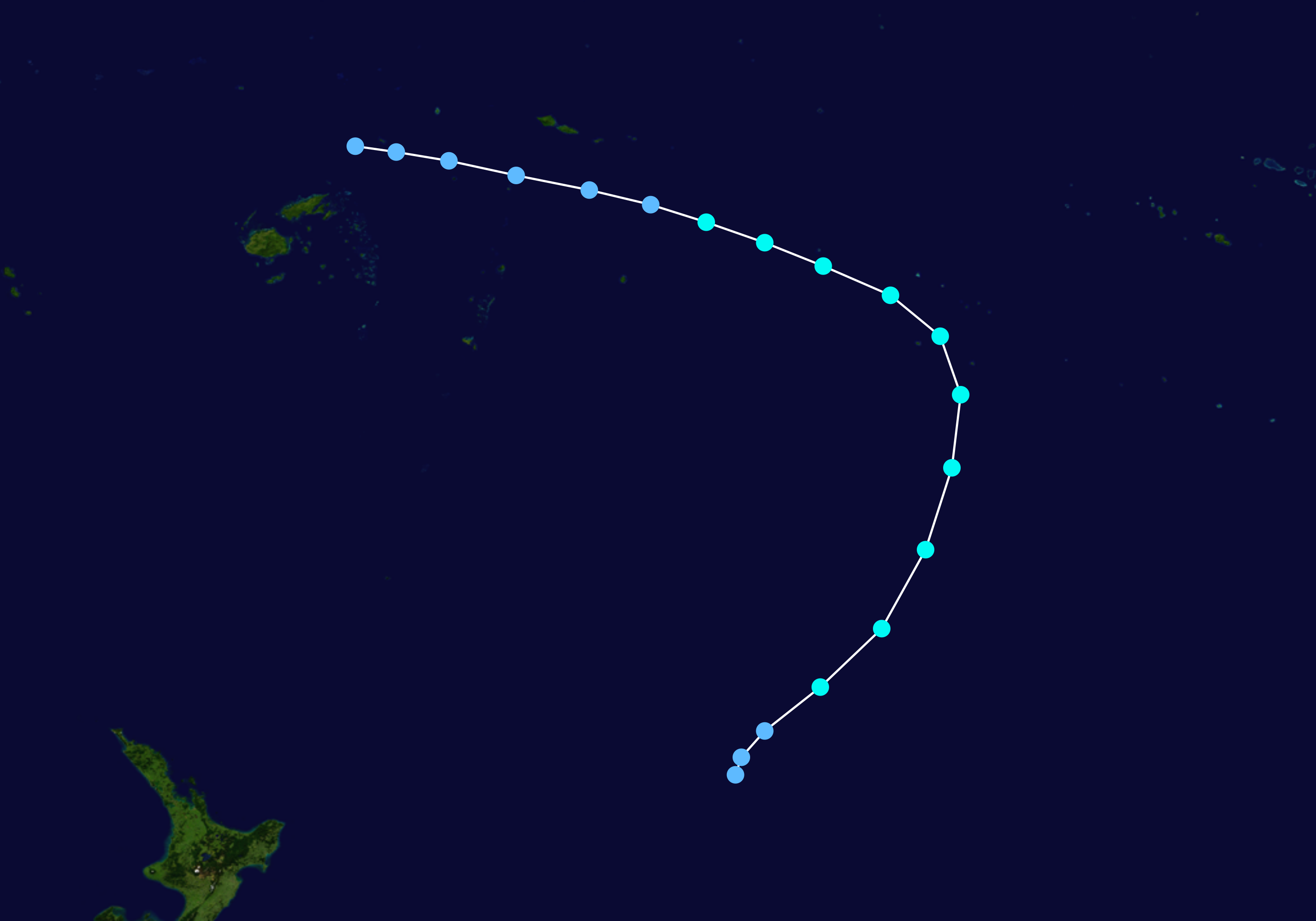
- Duration: February 20 – February 24
- Peak intensity: 100 km/h (65 mph) (10-min); 980 hPa (mbar)

Daman existed from February 20 to February 24.

=== Tropical Cyclone SP198008 ===
- Category 1 tropical cyclone (Australian scale)
- Tropical storm (SSHWS)
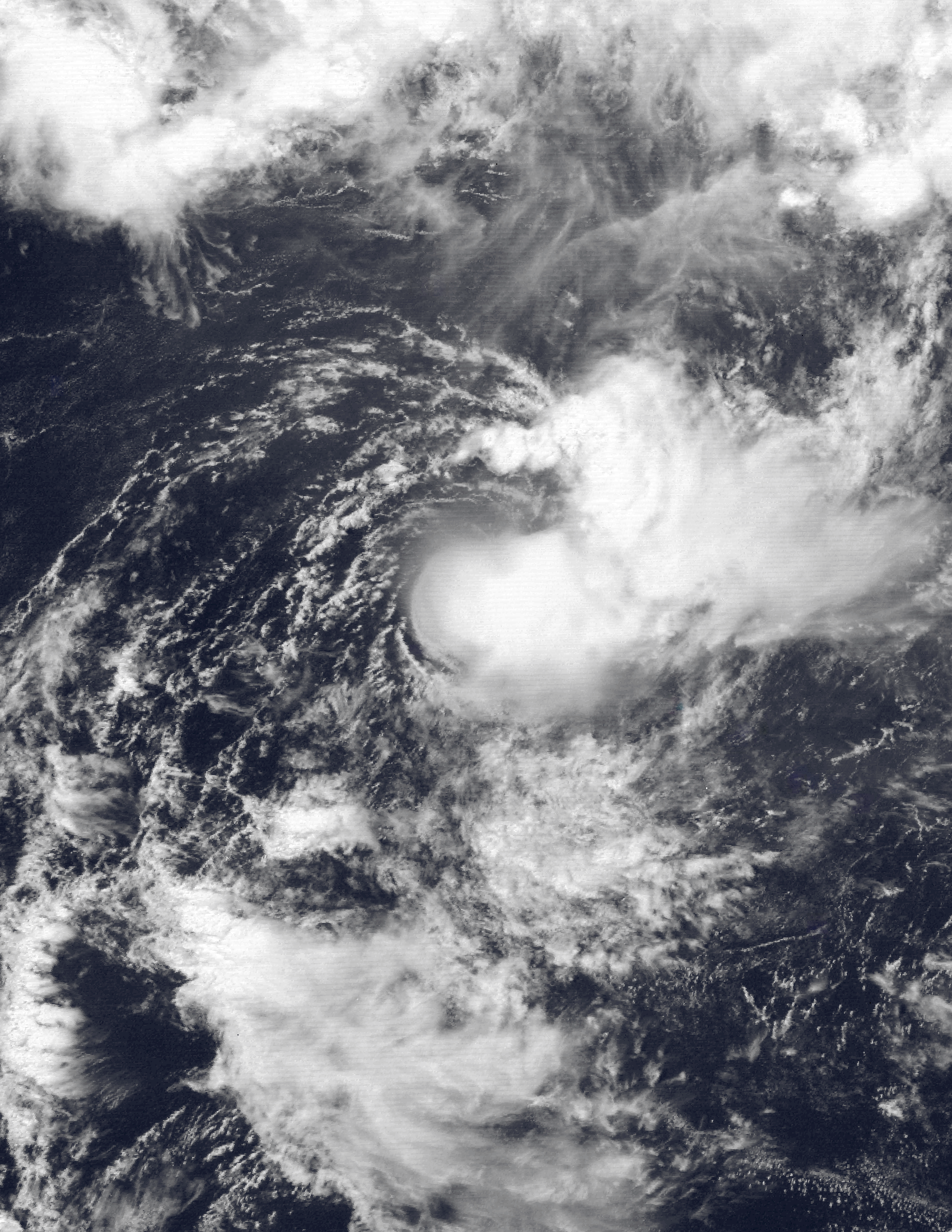
- Duration: February 22 – March 7
- Peak intensity: 75 km/h (45 mph) (10-min); 990 hPa (mbar)

This cyclone existed from February 22 to March 7.

=== Tropical Cyclone Esau ===
- Category 2 tropical cyclone (Australian scale)
- Tropical storm (SSHWS)
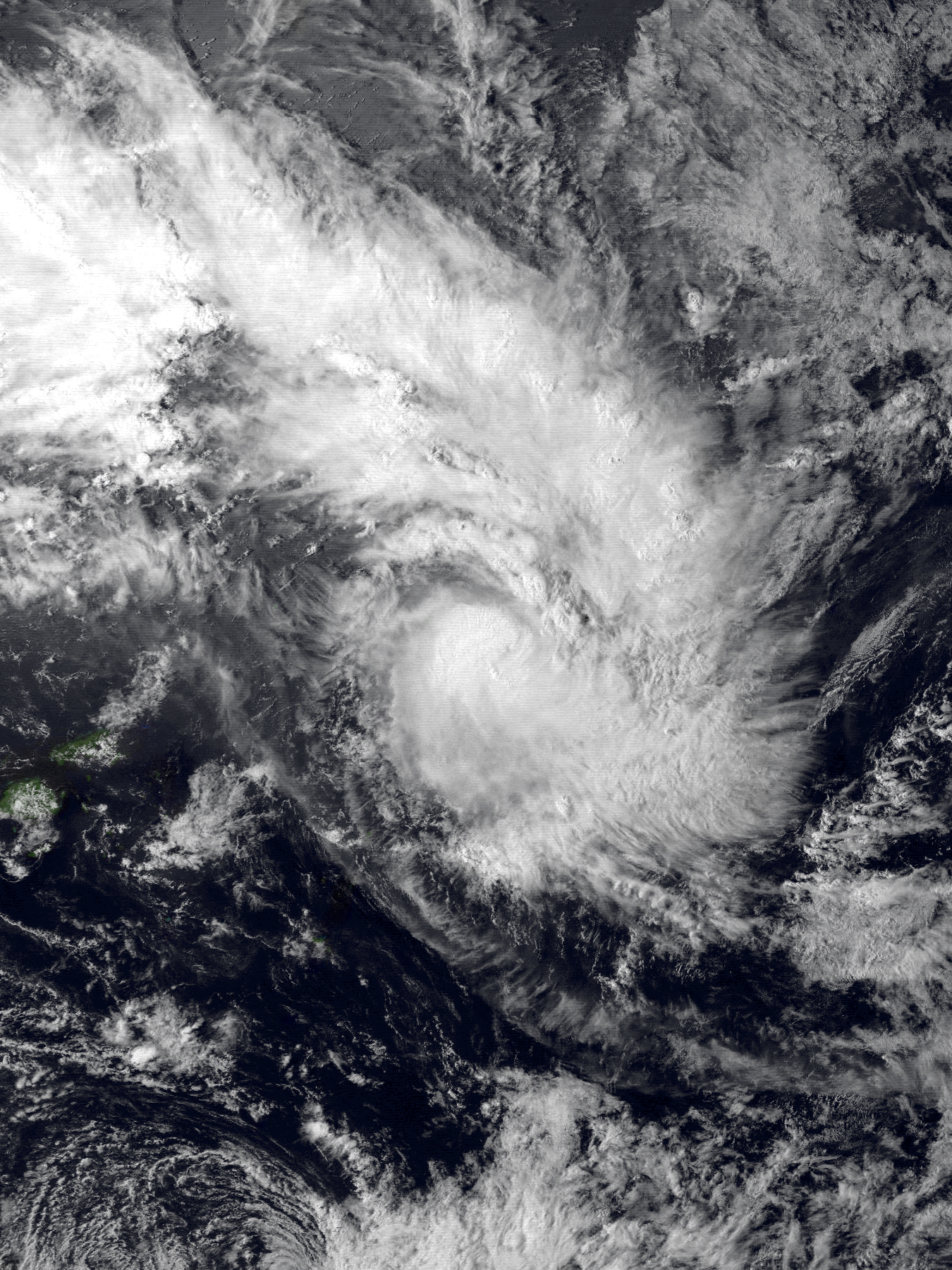
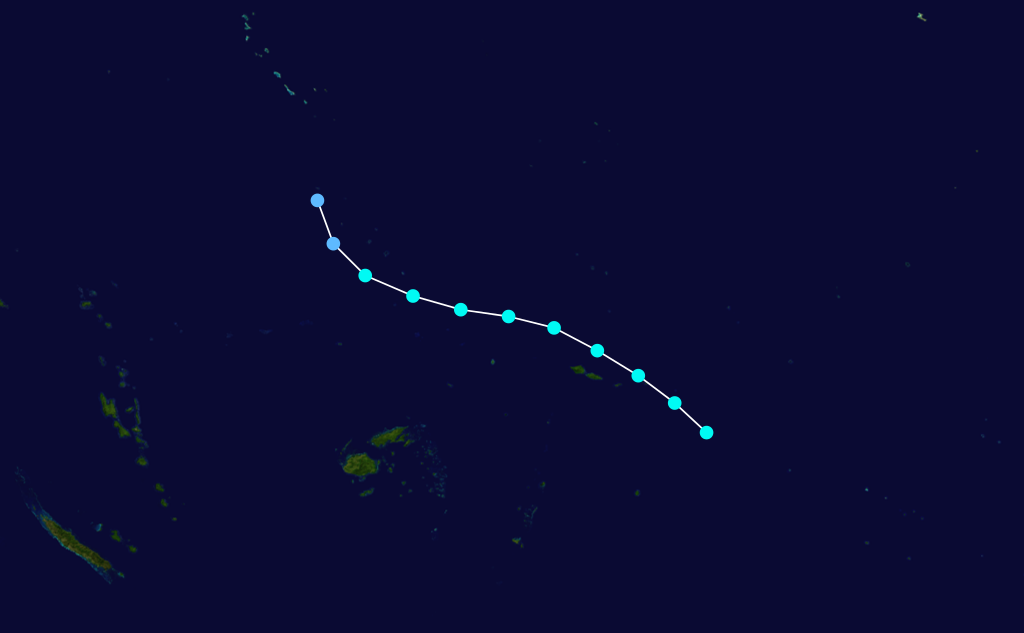
- Duration: March 1 – March 5
- Peak intensity: 100 km/h (65 mph) (10-min); 980 hPa (mbar)

Esau existed from March 1 to March 5.

=== Severe Tropical Cyclone Freda ===
- Category 3 severe tropical cyclone (Australian scale)
- Category 2 tropical cyclone (SSHWS)
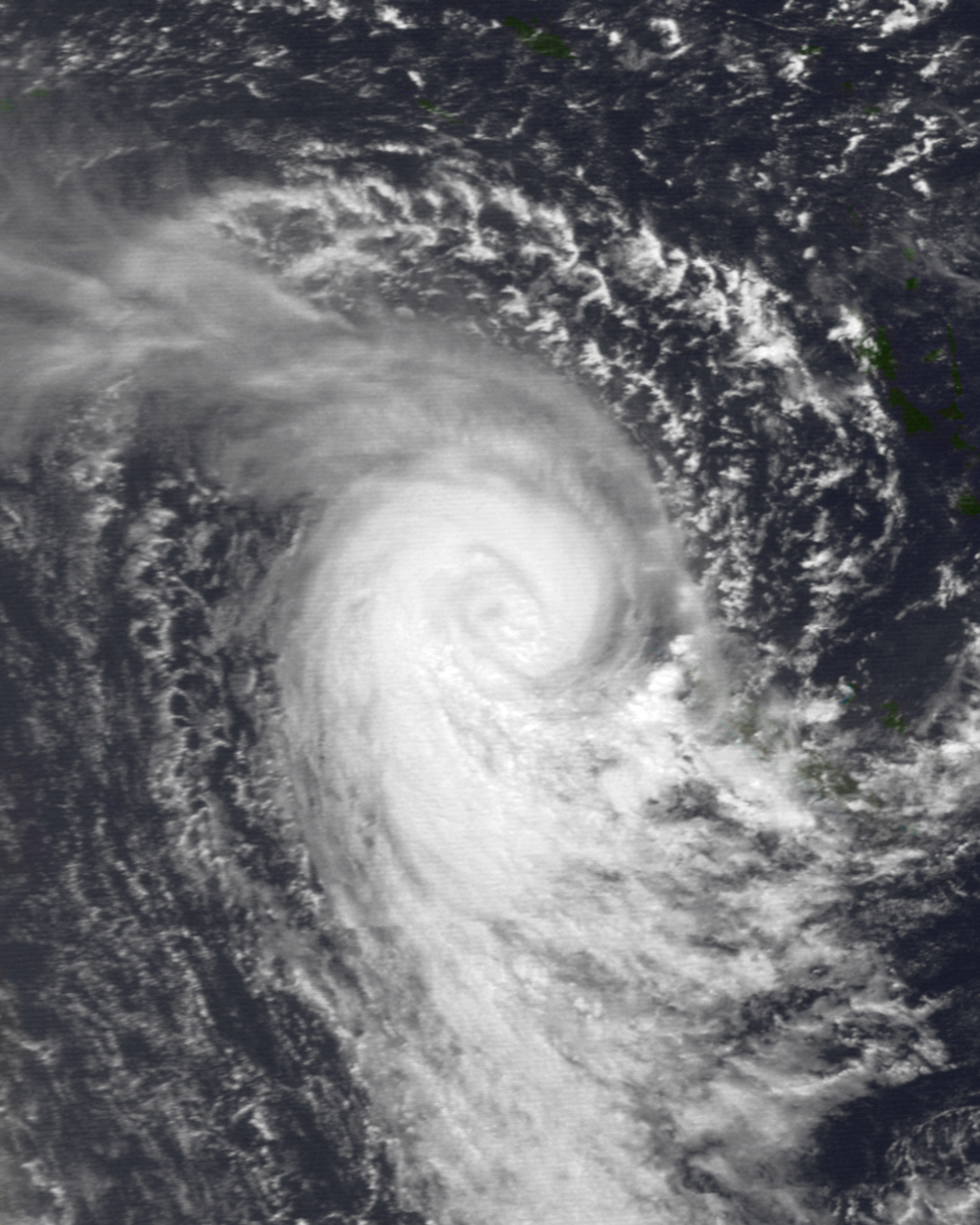
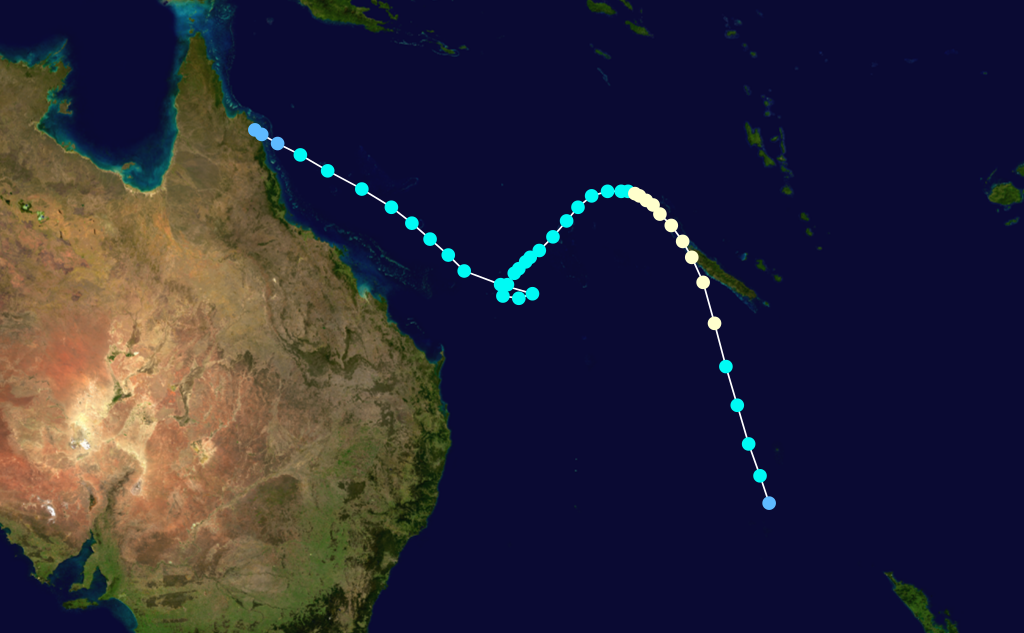
- Duration: March 4 (Crossed 160°E) – March 9
- Peak intensity: 150 km/h (90 mph) (10-min); 955 hPa (mbar)

Freda existed from February 24 to March 9.

=== Severe Tropical Cyclone Tahmar ===
- Category 3 severe tropical cyclone (Australian scale)
- Category 1 tropical cyclone (SSHWS)
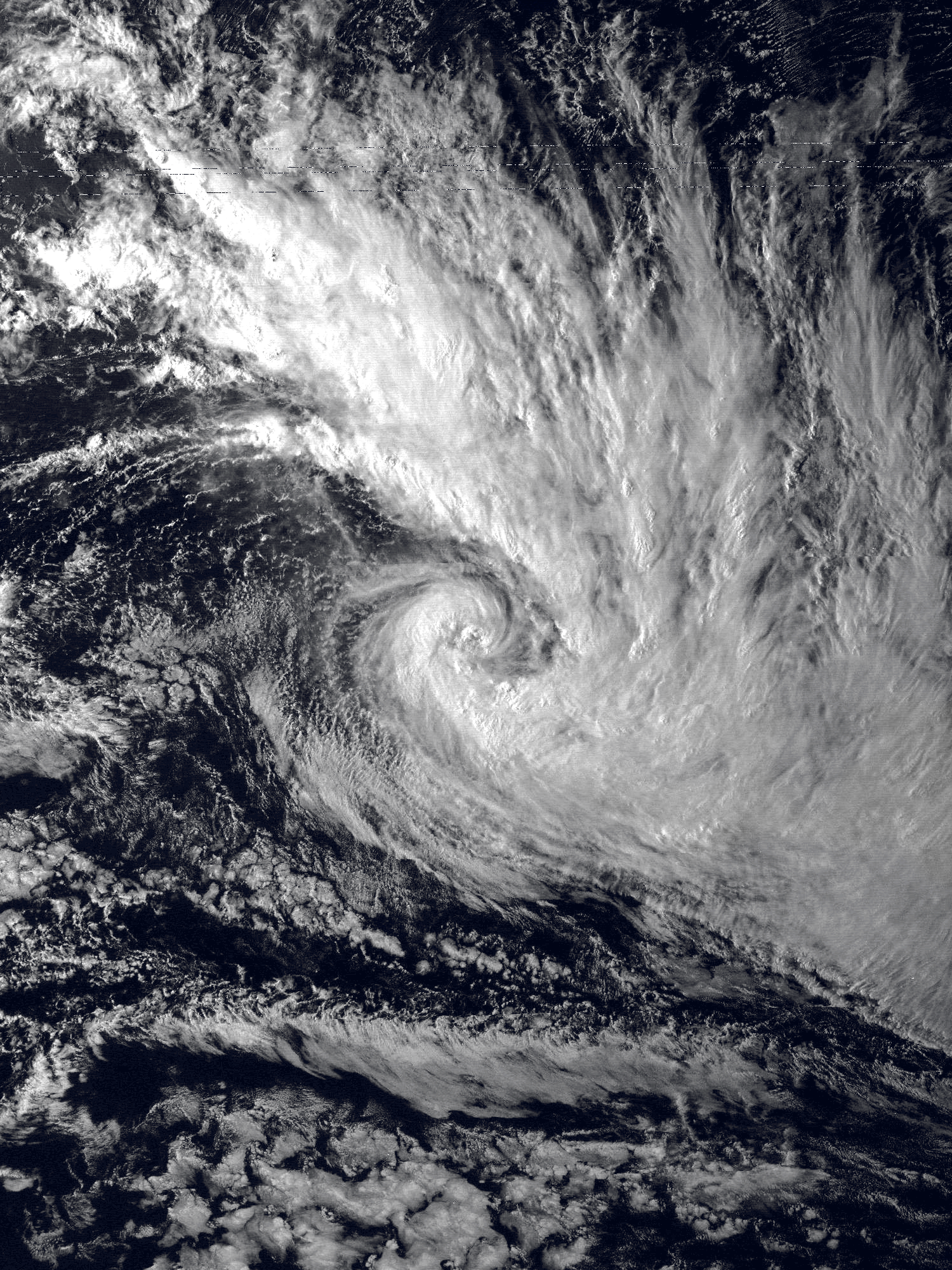
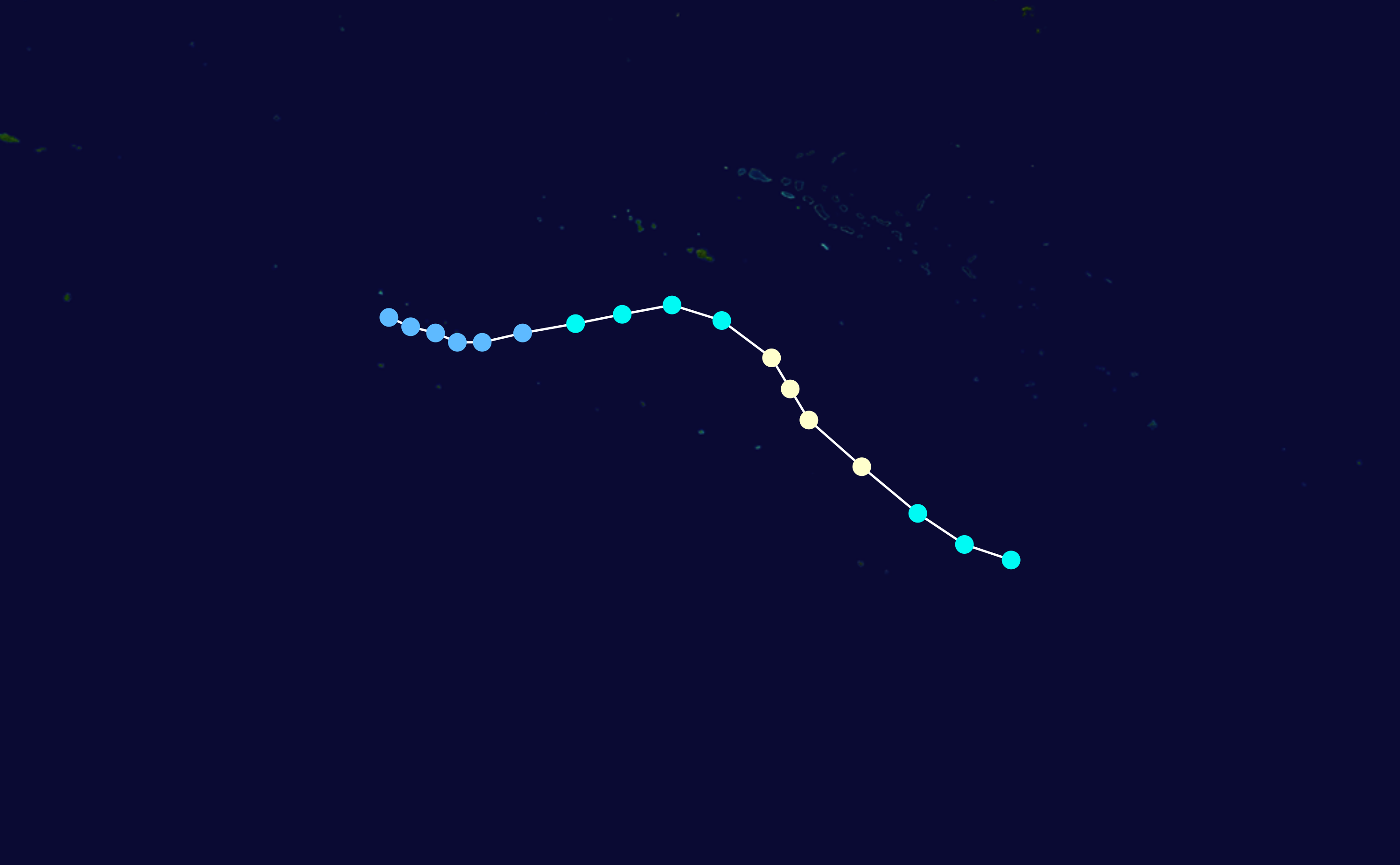
- Duration: March 8 – March 13
- Peak intensity: 120 km/h (75 mph) (10-min); 970 hPa (mbar)

Tahmar existed from March 8 to March 13.

=== Tropical Cyclone Fran ===
- Category 2 tropical cyclone (Australian scale)
- Tropical storm (SSHWS)
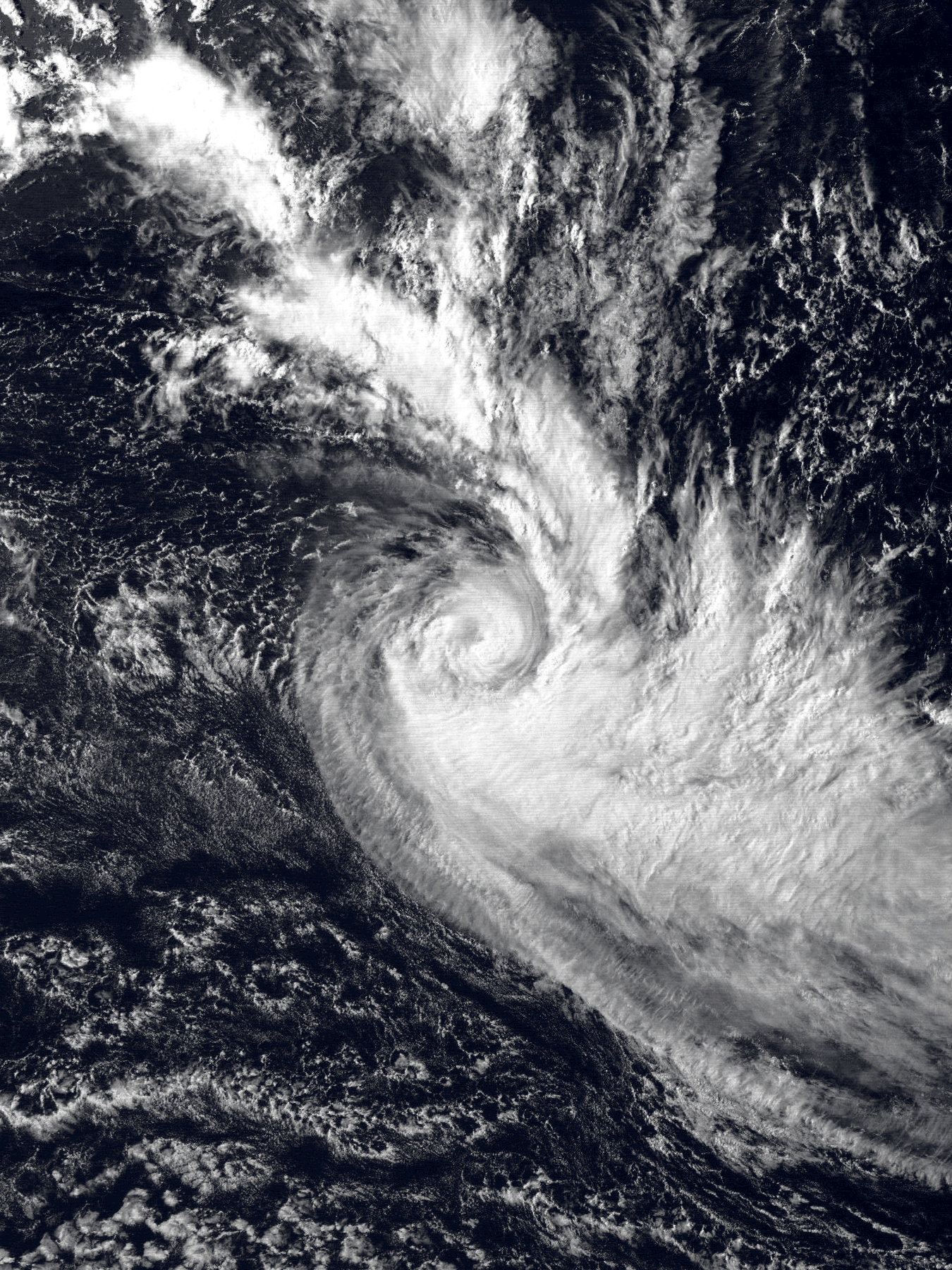
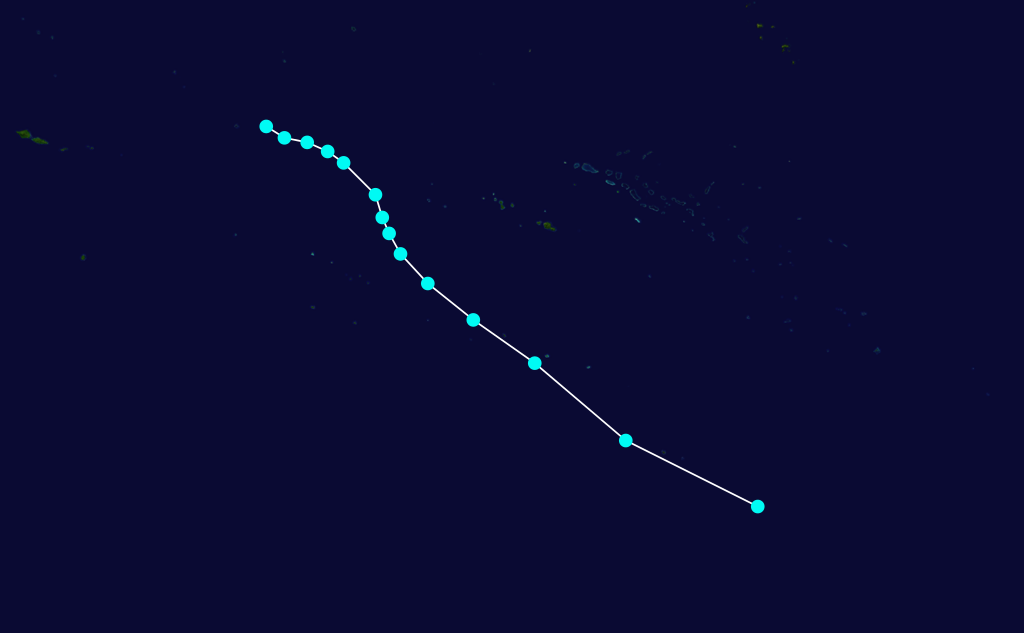
- Duration: March 17 – March 24
- Peak intensity: 95 km/h (60 mph) (10-min); 985 hPa (mbar)

Fran existed from March 17 to March 24.

=== Other systems ===
The JTWC initiated warnings on Tropical Cyclone 12P during January 26, which had moved into the basin from the Australian region during the previous day. The system subsequently passed in between Vanuatu and New Caledonia before it was last noted during January 27.

== Season effects ==
Name	Dates	Peak intensity			Areas affected	Damage (USD)	Deaths	Ref(s).
Name	Dates	Category	Wind speed	Pressure	Areas affected	Damage (USD)	Deaths	Ref(s).
Diola	November 27 – 30	Category 1 tropical cyclone	75 km/h (45 mph)	990 hPa (29.23 inHg)				
Arthur	January 11 – 17	Category 3 severe tropical cyclone	130 km/h (80 mph)	965 hPa (28.50 inHg)				
Betsy	January 30 – February 4	Category 1 tropical cyclone	75 km/h (45 mph)	990 hPa (29.23 inHg)				
Cliff	February 8 – 13	Category 3 severe tropical cyclone	120 km/h (75 mph)	970 hPa (28.64 inHg)				
Unnamed	February 16 – 21	Category 2 tropical cyclone	95 km/h (60 mph)	985 hPa (29.09 inHg)				
Daman	February 20 – 24	Category 2 tropical cyclone	100 km/h (65 mph)	980 hPa (28.94 inHg)				
Unnamed	February 22 – March 7	Category 1 tropical cyclone	75 km/h (45 mph)	990 hPa (29.23 inHg)				
Esau	March 1 – 5	Category 2 tropical cyclone	100 km/h (65 mph)	980 hPa (28.94 inHg)				
Freda	March 4 – 9	Category 3 severe tropical cyclone	150 km/h (90 mph)	955 hPa (28.20 inHg)				
Tahmar	March 8 – 13	Category 3 severe tropical cyclone	120 km/h (75 mph)	970 hPa (28.64 inHg)	French Polynesia			
Fran	March 17 – 24	Category 2 tropical cyclone	100 km/h (65 mph)	980 hPa (28.94 inHg)				
Season aggregates
11 systems	November 27, 1980– March 24, 1981		150 km/h (90 mph)	955 hPa (28.20 inHg)				

== See also ==
- Atlantic hurricane seasons: 1980, 1981
- Eastern Pacific hurricane seasons: 1980, 1981
- Western Pacific typhoon seasons: 1980, 1981
- North Indian Ocean cyclone seasons: 1980, 1981
