= List of unnamed tropical cyclones =

The list of unnamed tropical cyclones since naming began includes all tropical cyclones that met the criteria for naming in a basin, but that for whatever reason, did not receive a name. These systems have occurred in all basins and for various reasons.

== Scope, reasons, and naming overview ==
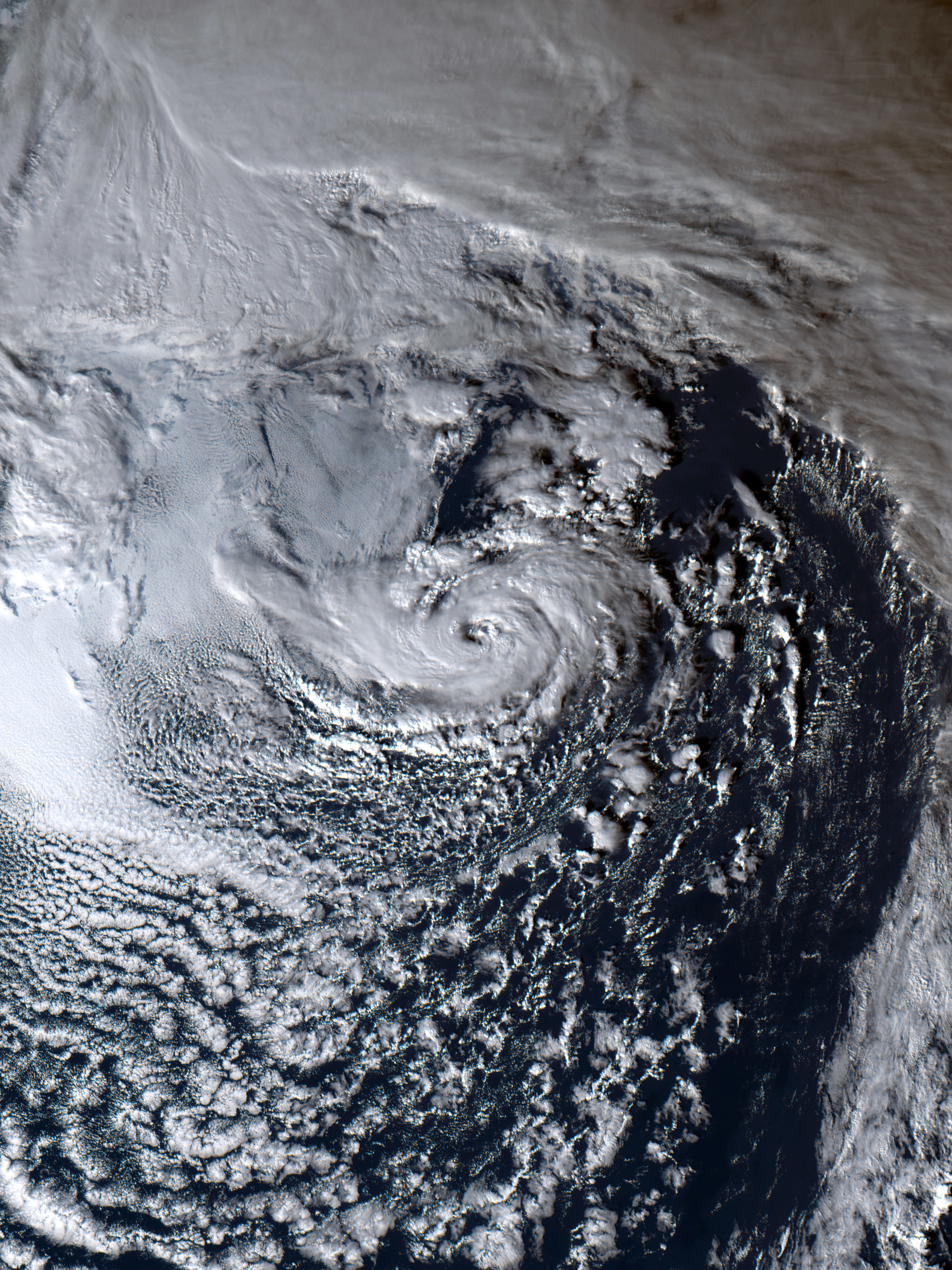
The unnamed subtropical storm 01L in the North Atlantic in 2023

Naming has been used since the 1950 season. In order to ease communications and advisories, tropical cyclones are named when, according to the appropriate Regional Specialized Meteorological Center or Tropical Cyclone Warning Center, it has reached tropical storm status. A tropical cyclone with winds of tropical storm intensity or higher goes unnamed when operationally, it is not considered to have met the criteria for naming. Reasons for this include:

- Being missed during a season, usually because of uncertainties in classification in real time. Usually, subtropical cyclones are missed more often. An example of this is the Azores subtropical storm from the 2005 Atlantic hurricane season.
- Disagreements between warning centre and naming centres over intensity of a cyclone. An example of this is Tropical Storm 06W from the 1995 Pacific typhoon season.
- Formation of a cyclone in an area where no official agency is responsible for naming. An example of this is Tropical Cyclone 29P from the 1996–97 South Pacific cyclone season.
- Intentionally left unnamed to avoid confusion. An example of this is the Perfect Storm from the 1991 Atlantic hurricane season.
- Post-operational upgrading. An example of this is Tropical Storm One-E from the 1996 Pacific hurricane season.

== North Atlantic Ocean ==
Only unnamed subtropical cyclones that could have been named are included. This excludes several that existed, but that were unnamed because subtropical cyclones were not named when they existed.

Storm	Year	Peak classification
Twelve	1950	Tropical storm
Fifteen	1950	Tropical storm
Sixteen	1950	Tropical storm
One	1951	Tropical storm
Twelve	1951	Category 1 hurricane
"Groundhog Day"	1952	Tropical storm
Three	1952	Tropical storm
Five	1952	Tropical storm
Eight	1952	Tropical storm
Eleven	1952	Tropical storm
Two	1953	Tropical storm
Five	1953	Tropical storm
Eight	1953	Tropical storm
Eleven	1953	Tropical storm
Thirteen	1953	Tropical storm
One	1954	Tropical storm
Two	1954	Tropical storm
Four	1954	Tropical storm
Nine	1954	Tropical storm
Eleven	1954	Tropical storm
Thirteen	1954	Category 2 hurricane
Fifteen	1954	Tropical storm
Five	1955	Tropical storm
Eleven	1955	Tropical storm
Twelve	1955	Tropical storm
One	1956	Tropical storm
Two	1956	Tropical storm
Nine	1956	Tropical storm
Ten	1956	Tropical storm
Twelve	1956	Tropical storm
One	1957	Tropical storm
Eight	1957	Tropical storm
One	1958	Tropical storm
Twelve	1958	Tropical storm

Storm	Year	Peak classification
"Escuminac"	1959	Category 1 hurricane
Six	1959	Tropical storm
Eight	1959	Tropical storm
Nine	1959	Tropical storm
"Texas"	1960	Tropical storm
Six	1960	Tropical storm
Six	1961	Tropical storm
Twelve	1961	Tropical storm
One	1962	Tropical storm
Ten	1962	Category 1 hurricane
One	1963	Tropical storm
Four	1963	Category 1 hurricane
One	1964	Tropical storm
Two	1964	Tropical storm
Three	1964	Category 1 hurricane
Thirteen	1964	Tropical storm
One	1965	Tropical storm
Four	1965	Tropical storm
Seven	1965	Tropical storm
Nine	1965	Tropical storm
Ten	1965	Tropical storm
Two	1966	Tropical storm
Fourteen	1966	Tropical storm
Fifteen	1966	Tropical storm
One	1967	Tropical storm
Two	1967	Tropical storm
Four	1967	Tropical storm
Eight	1967	Tropical storm
Twelve	1967	Tropical storm
Five	1968	Tropical storm
Ten	1969	Category 1 hurricane
Eleven	1969	Tropical storm
Sixteen	1969	Tropical storm
Seventeen	1969	Category 1 hurricane

Storm	Year	Peak classification
Eight	1970	Category 1 hurricane
Ten	1970	Tropical storm
Twenty-One	1970	Tropical storm
"Caribbean–Azores"	1970	Category 1 hurricane
"Canada"	1970	Category 2 hurricane
Nineteen	1970	Category 2 hurricane
Twenty-Three	1970	Tropical storm
Two	1971	Category 1 hurricane
"Gulf Coast"	1987	Tropical storm
Unnamed	1988	Tropical storm
"Perfect Storm" (Note: Was deliberately left unnamed to avoid any confusion as the news media was focused on the Perfect Storm and was expected to be short-lived and primarily of concern to maritime interests.)	1991	Category 1 hurricane
Unnamed (Note: Subtropical storms were not given names prior to 2002. However, since this system was recognized post-operationally it is included in this list.)	1997	Subtropical storm
Unnamed	2000	Subtropical storm
"Azores"	2005	Subtropical storm
Unnamed	2006	Tropical storm
Unnamed (Note: Advisories were not issued on this system during August/September 2011 because of the intermittent nature of the convection and the somewhat frontal nature of the satellite presentation.)	2011	Tropical storm
Unnamed	2013	Subtropical storm
Unnamed	2023	Subtropical storm

== South Atlantic Ocean ==
The South Atlantic is not officially classified as a tropical cyclone basin by the World Meteorological Organization and does not have a designated regional specialized meteorological center (RSMC) that gives official names to tropical cyclones. Despite this, in 2011, the Hydrographic Center of the Brazilian Navy began giving unofficial names to tropical and subtropical cyclones in the south Atlantic. Prior to that, a few systems in the south Atlantic were given names.

There has been one system, Tropical Storm 01Q in 2021, that was monitored and designated 01Q by the National Oceanic and Atmospheric Administration (NOAA). However, the Brazilian Navy did not recognize the system as a tropical cyclone and it remains unnamed.

== Eastern and Central North Pacific Ocean ==
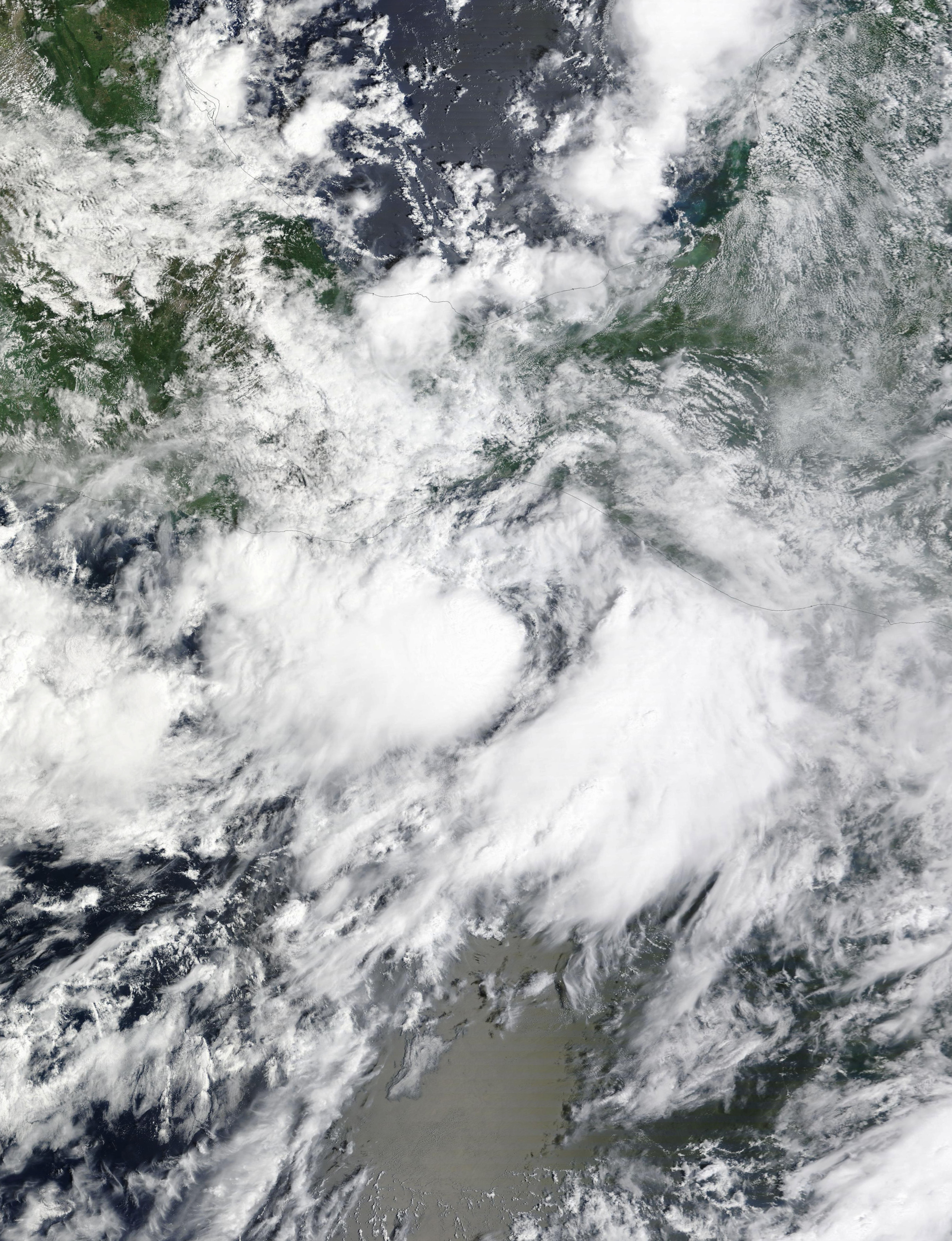
The unnamed tropical storm in October 2024

Naming began in 1960. Before 1960, a few systems in the central Pacific basin were given names, generally in an ad hoc manner.

Storm	Year	Peak classification
Four (Note: This system was upgraded from a tropical depression to a tropical storm after a letter from a ship called the Golden State prompted a re evaluation of the system.)	1962	Tropical storm
Hurricane "C"	1962	Unknown
Tropical Storm "R"	1962	Tropical storm
Tropical Storm "T"	1962	Tropical storm
Tropical Storm "X"	1962	Tropical storm
Tropical Storm "Z"	1962	Tropical storm
Tropical Storm "A"	1962	Tropical storm
Seven (Note: This system was upgraded from a tropical depression to a tropical storm after a ship called the Richfield reported sustained winds of 115 km/h (70 mph).)	1962	Tropical storm
Four (Note: This system was not named or numbered as a tropical cyclone operationally, but has been recognized as an unnamed tropical storm since.)	1963	Tropical storm
"Pacific Northwest"	1975	Category 1 hurricane
Unnamed (Note: Was upgraded from a tropical depression to a tropical storm after the United States Coast Guard relayed ship reports to the National Hurricane Center, that suggested the cyclone was a tropical storm.)	1996	Tropical storm
Unnamed (Note: Was upgraded from a tropical depression to a tropical storm after European Space Agency's Advanced Scatterometer (ASCAT) suggested that the cyclone was a tropical storm.)	2020	Tropical storm
Unnamed (Note: Was upgraded from a tropical depression to a tropical storm after European Space Agency's Advanced Scatterometer (ASCAT) suggested that the cyclone was a tropical storm.)	2024	Tropical storm

== Western North Pacific Ocean ==
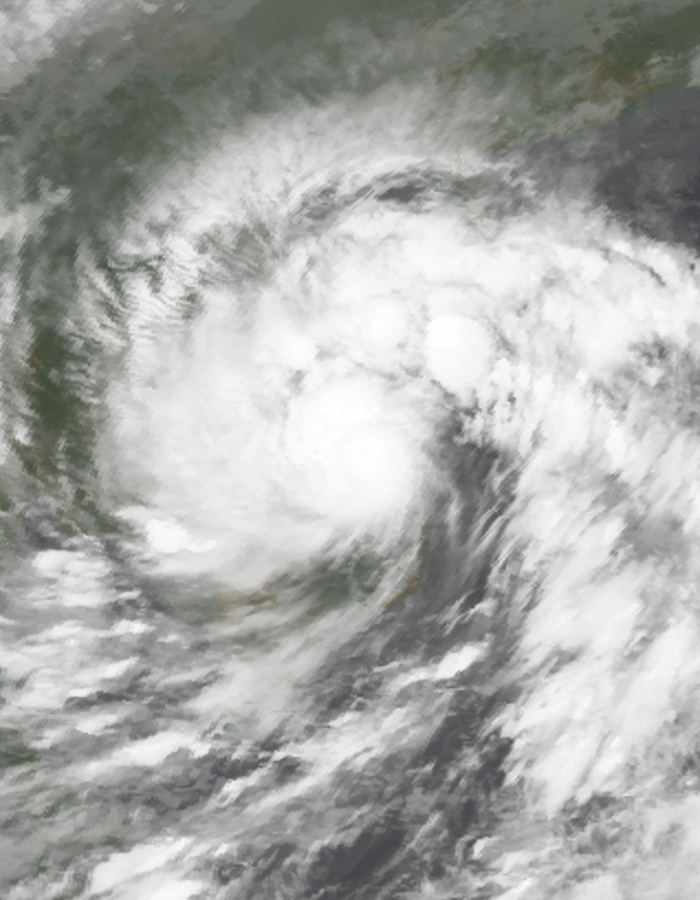
The unnamed tropical storm 35W in 1996

The official practice of tropical cyclone naming started in 1945 within the western north Pacific. Due to differences in wind speed criteria between the Japan Meteorological Agency and the Joint Typhoon Warning Center, a system will sometimes be considered a tropical storm by the JTWC but only a depression by the JMA, or vice versa. This results in several apparent unnamed systems. Prior to 2000, the JTWC was responsible for tropical cyclone naming, with the JMA assuming responsibility for naming from 2000 and beyond. Due to this, unnamed cyclones that met the JMA's tropical storm criteria but not those of the JTWC prior to 2000 are excluded. Likewise, systems that met the JTWC's tropical storm criteria but not those of the JMA from 2000 to present are also excluded.

Storm	Year	Peak classification
Tropical Storm 24W	1948	Tropical storm
Tropical Storm 26W	1948	Tropical storm
Tropical Storm 02W	1950	Tropical storm
Tropical Storm 12W	1952	Tropical storm
Tropical Storm 14W	1952	Tropical storm
Tropical Storm 04W	1953	Tropical storm
Tropical Storm 09W	1953	Tropical storm
Tropical Storm 13W	1953	Tropical storm
Tropical Storm 16W	1953	Tropical storm
Tropical Storm 22W	1953	Tropical storm
Tropical Storm 23W	1953	Tropical storm
Tropical Storm 01W	1954	Tropical storm
Tropical Storm 07W	1954	Tropical storm
Tropical Storm 08W	1954	Tropical storm
Tropical Storm 15W	1954	Tropical storm

Storm	Year	Peak classification
Tropical Storm 09W	1955	Tropical storm
Tropical Storm 17W	1955	Tropical storm
Tropical Storm 20W	1955	Tropical storm
Tropical Storm 02W	1956	Tropical storm
Tropical Storm 04W	1956	Tropical storm
Tropical Storm 08W	1956	Tropical storm
Tropical Storm 18W	1956	Tropical storm
Tropical Storm 01W	1957	Tropical storm
Tropical Storm 08W	1957	Tropical storm
Tropical Storm 17W	1957	Tropical storm
Tropical Storm 06W	1995	Tropical storm
Tropical Storm 24W (Note: Was operationally classified as a depression by both the JTWC and PAGASA, the latter of which named the system Ningning. However, it was later determined by JTWC that the system reached tropical storm intensity.)	1996	Tropical storm
Tropical Storm 35W	1996	Tropical storm
Tropical Storm 38W	1996	Tropical storm
Tropical Storm 03W	1998	Tropical storm

== North Indian Ocean ==
Due to differences in wind speed criteria between the India Meteorological Department and the Joint Typhoon Warning Center, a system will sometimes be considered a tropical storm by the JTWC but only a depression by the IMD. This results in several apparent unnamed systems. Because the IMD is responsible for naming, unnamed cyclones that met the JTWC's tropical storm criteria but not those of the IMD are excluded.

Naming has taken place since mid-2003.

There have been no unnamed tropical cyclones using the India Meteorological Department's criteria. One system, 2007's Yemyin, was upgraded after the fact and retroactively named.

== South-West Indian Ocean ==
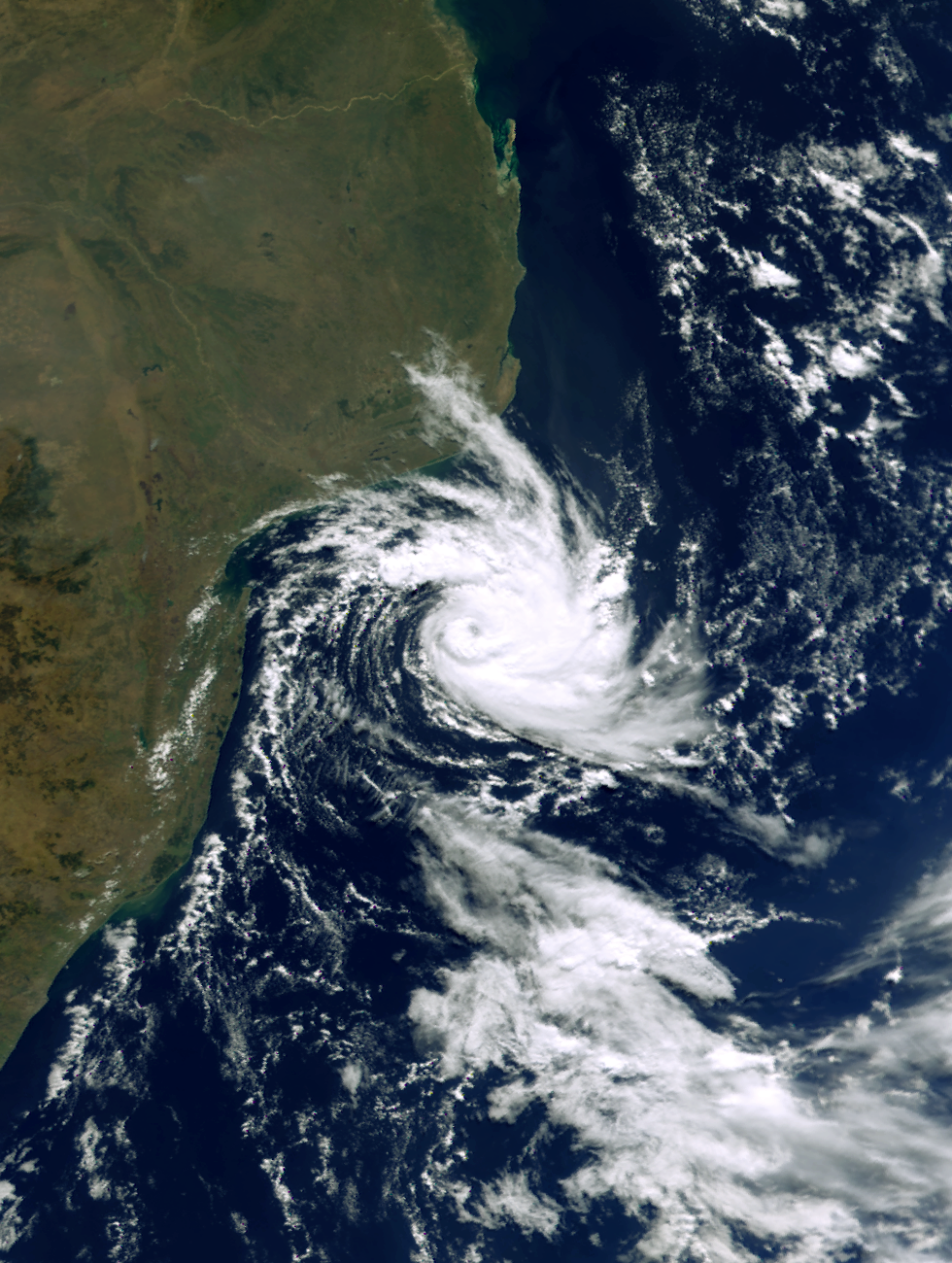
The unnamed subtropical depression 11R during the 2000–01 season

Tropical cyclones have been named within this basin since 1960, with any tropical or subtropical depressions that RSMC La Réunion analyze as having 10-minute sustained windspeeds of at least 65 km/h, 40 mph being named. However, unlike other basins RSMC La Réunion does not name tropical depressions, as they delegate the rights to name tropical cyclones to the subregional tropical cyclone warning centers in Mauritius or Madagascar depending on whether the system is located east or west of the 55th meridian east.

Storm	Year	Peak classification
Moderate Tropical Storm F1	1998–99	Moderate tropical storm
Subtropical Depression 13	1999–2000	Subtropical depression
Moderate Tropical Storm 10	2000–01	Moderate tropical storm
Subtropical Depression 11	2000–01	Subtropical depression
Subtropical Depression 15	2006–07	Subtropical depression
Tropical Cyclone 01U	2007–08	Category 1 tropical cyclone
Subtropical Depression 10	2009–10	Subtropical depression
Subtropical Depression 09	2010–11	Subtropical depression
Subtropical Depression 13	2013–14	Subtropical depression
Moderate Tropical Storm 01	2018–19	Moderate tropical storm
Moderate Tropical Storm 08	2021–22	Moderate tropical storm
Moderate Tropical Storm 09	2022–23	Moderate tropical storm

== Australian region ==
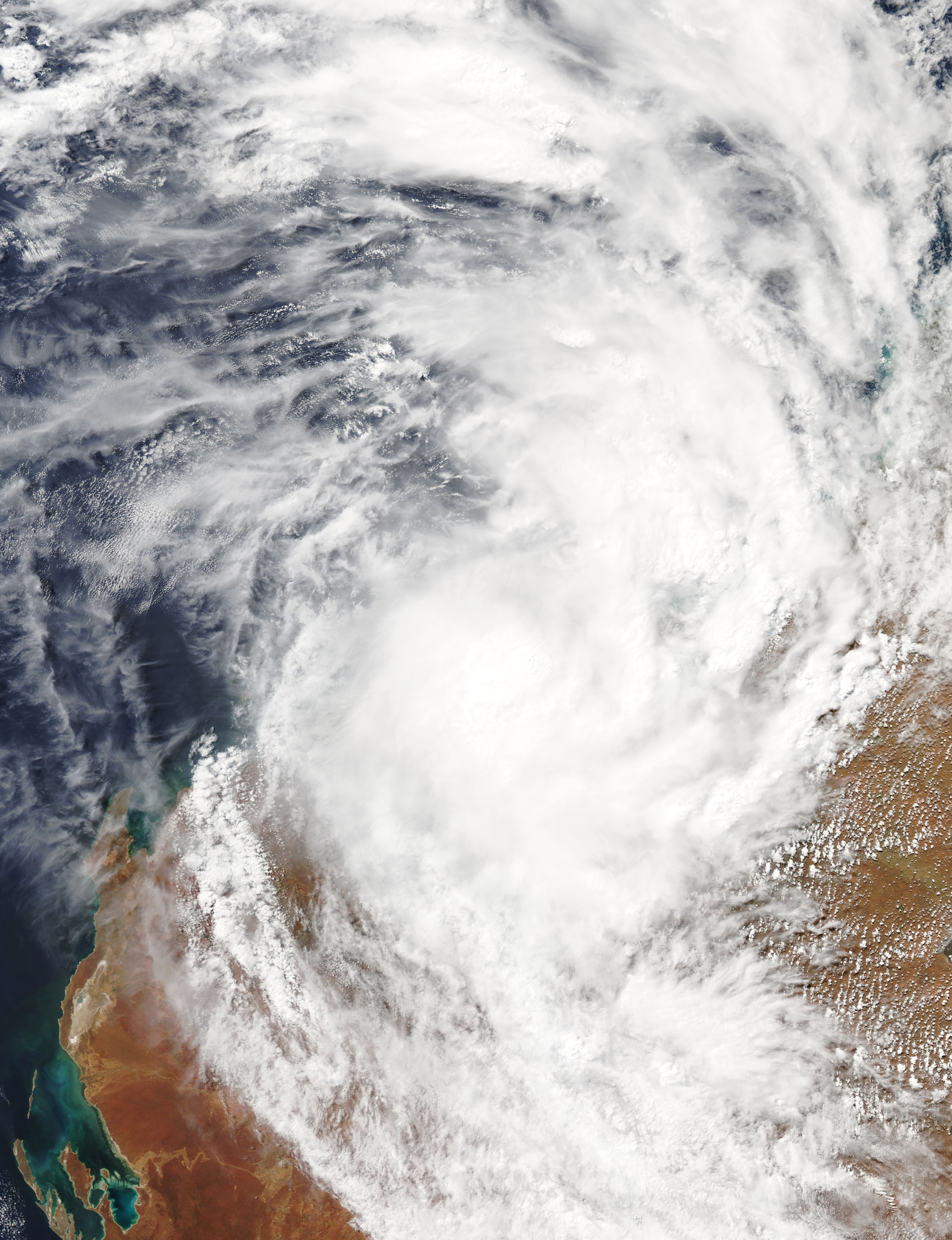
The unnamed cyclone 22U during the 2016–17 season

Storm	Year	Peak classification
Five	1964–65	Unknown
Six	1964–65	Unknown
Six	1965–66	Unknown
Nine	1965–66	Unknown
Two	1967–68	Unknown
Three	1967–68	Unknown
Eleven	1967–68	Unknown
Thirteen	1967–68	Unknown
Seventeen	1967–68	Unknown
Fifteen	1968–69	Unknown
Sixteen	1968–69	Unknown
One	1969–70	Unknown
Seven	1969–70	Unknown

Storm	Year	Peak classification
"Flores"	1972–73	Category 3 severe tropical cyclone
Tropical Cyclone 04U	1981–82	Category 1 tropical cyclone
Tropical Cyclone 06U	1983–84	Category 1 tropical cyclone
Tropical Cyclone 01U	2002–03	Category 2 tropical cyclone
Tropical Cyclone 01U	2007–08	Category 1 tropical cyclone
Tropical Cyclone 25U	2010–11	Category 1 tropical cyclone
Tropical Cyclone 22U	2016–17	Category 2 tropical cyclone
Tropical Cyclone 01U	2022–23	Category 1 tropical cyclone
Tropical Cyclone 09U	2024–25	Category 1 tropical cyclone
Tropical Cyclone 25U	2024–25	Category 1 tropical cyclone

== South Pacific Ocean ==
The unnamed cyclone 29P during the 1996–97 season

Storm	Year	Peak classification
One	1971–72	Category 1 tropical cyclone
Six	1971–72	Category 1 tropical cyclone
One	1973–74	Category 1 tropical cyclone
Five	1976–77	Category 1 tropical cyclone
Six	1976–77	Category 1 tropical cyclone
Five	1980–81	Category 2 tropical cyclone
Seven	1980–81	Category 1 tropical cyclone
Four	1983–84	Category 1 tropical cyclone
Six	1983–84	Category 1 tropical cyclone
One	1984–85	Category 1 tropical cyclone
Tropical Cyclone 19P	1986–87	Category 2 tropical cyclone
Two	1990–91	Category 1 tropical cyclone
Tropical Cyclone 29P (Note: Could not be named during February 1997 as it had developed into a tropical cyclone within the subtropic region of the Southern Pacific.)	1996–97	Category 2 tropical cyclone
