= 1974 Pacific hurricane season =

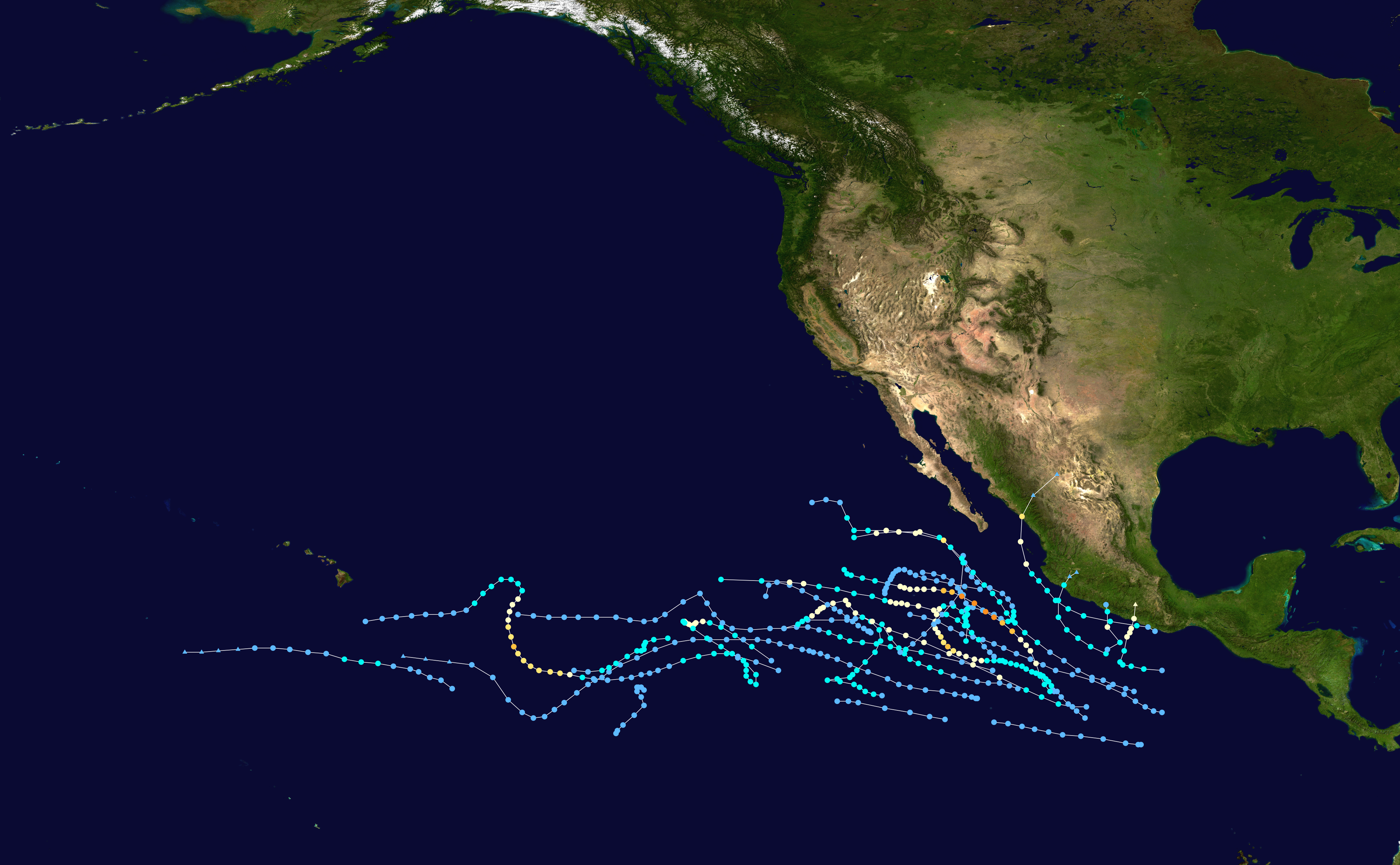
- Season summary map

Seasonal boundaries
- First system formed: May 28, 1974
- Last system dissipated: October 24, 1974

Strongest storm
- Name: Maggie
  - Maximum winds: 140 mph (220 km/h) (1-minute sustained)
  - Lowest pressure: 928 mbar (hPa; 27.4 inHg)

Seasonal statistics
- Total depressions: 25
- Total storms: 18
- Hurricanes: 11
- Major hurricanes (Cat. 3+): 3
- Total fatalities: 21-31
- Total damage: $4 million (1974 USD)

Related articles
- 1974 Atlantic hurricane season; 1974 Pacific typhoon season; 1974 North Indian Ocean cyclone season

The 1974 Pacific hurricane season featured one of the most active periods of tropical cyclones on record with five storms existing simultaneously. The season officially started May 15 in the eastern Pacific, and June 1 in the central Pacific, and lasted until November 30. These dates conventionally delimit the period of each year when most tropical cyclones form in the northeast Pacific Ocean.

With 17 named storms and 11 hurricanes, this season was slightly above average. An additional tropical storm formed in the Central Pacific as well. The year also featured a period where six systems, Ione, Olive, Kirsten, Lorraine, Joyce, and Maggie, were all active at once on August 26, a very unusual occurrence. At the time, Olive was a Central Pacific storm that had weakened to a tropical depression while the other five were of at least tropical storm intensity simultaneously and remained so until early on August 27. Five storms were also active between the evening of August 23 and the morning of August 24.

== Season summary ==
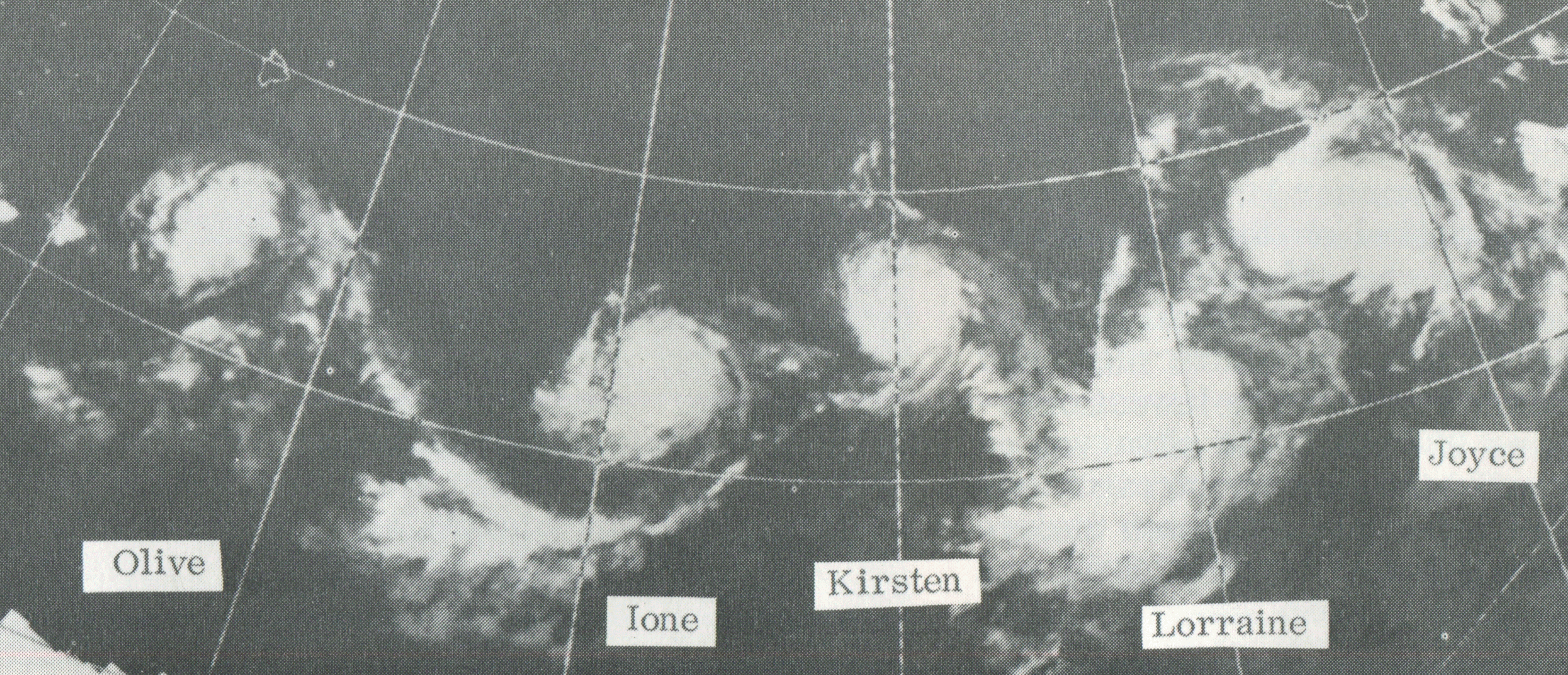
This weather satellite image (from left to right) of Tropical Cyclones Olive, Ione, Kirsten, Lorraine, and Joyce was taken on August 23, 1974

The overall activity of the 1974 season was near normal, with 25 tropical cyclones developing. Of these storms, 18 were named, 11 became hurricanes and 3 reached major hurricane status. Although the overall number of storms was normal, an exceptionally active period took place from August 19 through September 1. During this two-week span, six storms developed, five of which were active simultaneously on August 23: Ione, Joyce, Kirsten, Lorraine and Olive. Of the season's 447 bulletins, 139 were issued during this period.

== Systems ==
=== Tropical Storm Aletta ===
- Tropical storm (SSHWS)
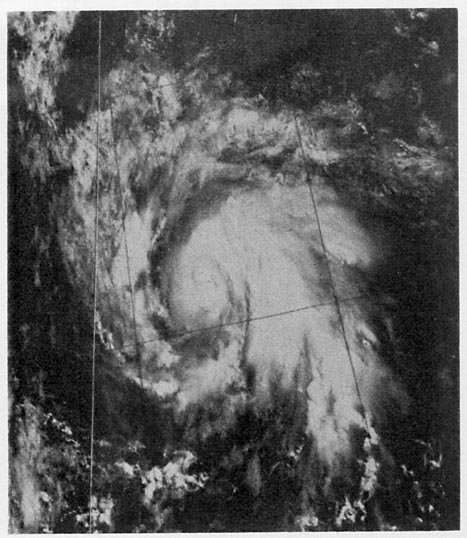
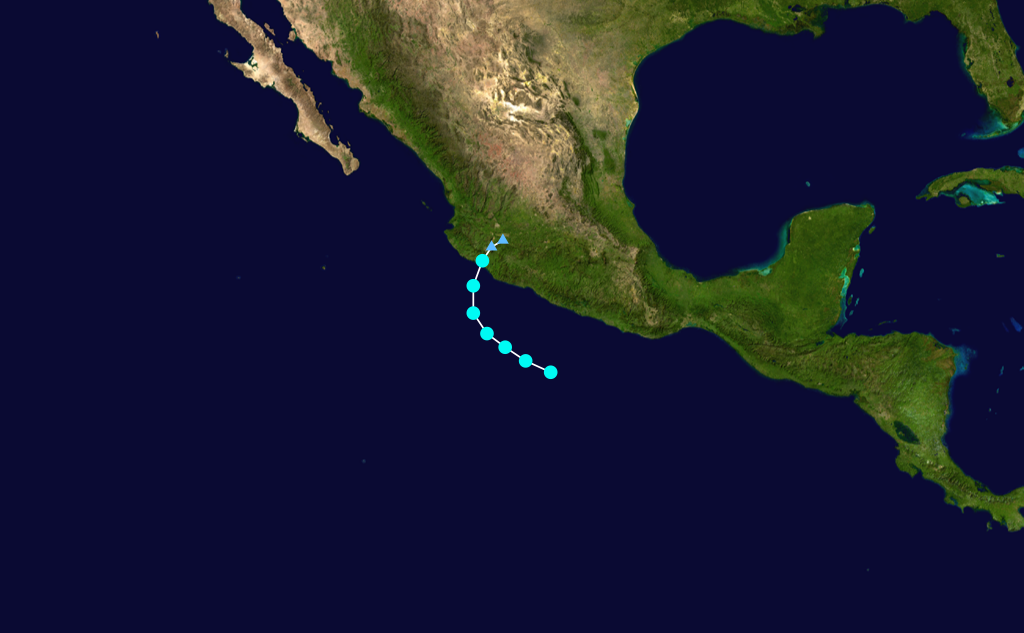
- Duration: May 28 – May 30
- Peak intensity: 60 mph (95 km/h) (1-min); 992 mbar (hPa)

A tropical disturbance formed to the south of the Gulf of Tehuantepec on May 24; sea surface temperatures (SST's) in the area were around 88 °F (31 °C). The disturbance slowly organized over the next 60 hours, as it was detaching from the Intertropical Convergence Zone (ITCZ). On May 28, Tropical Storm Aletta formed. It recurved to the northeast and made landfall in western Mexico on May 30. Effects were minimal.

=== Tropical Storm Blanca ===
- Tropical storm (SSHWS)
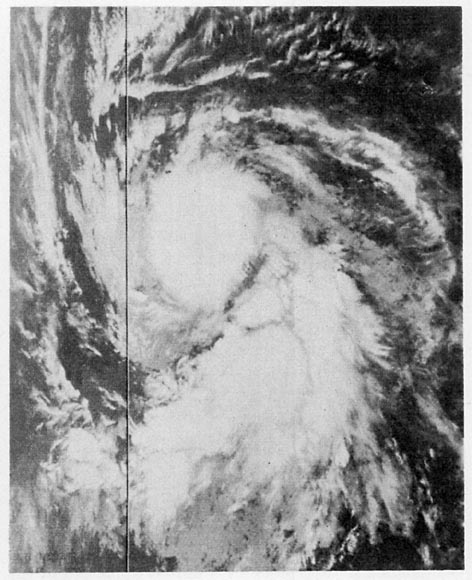
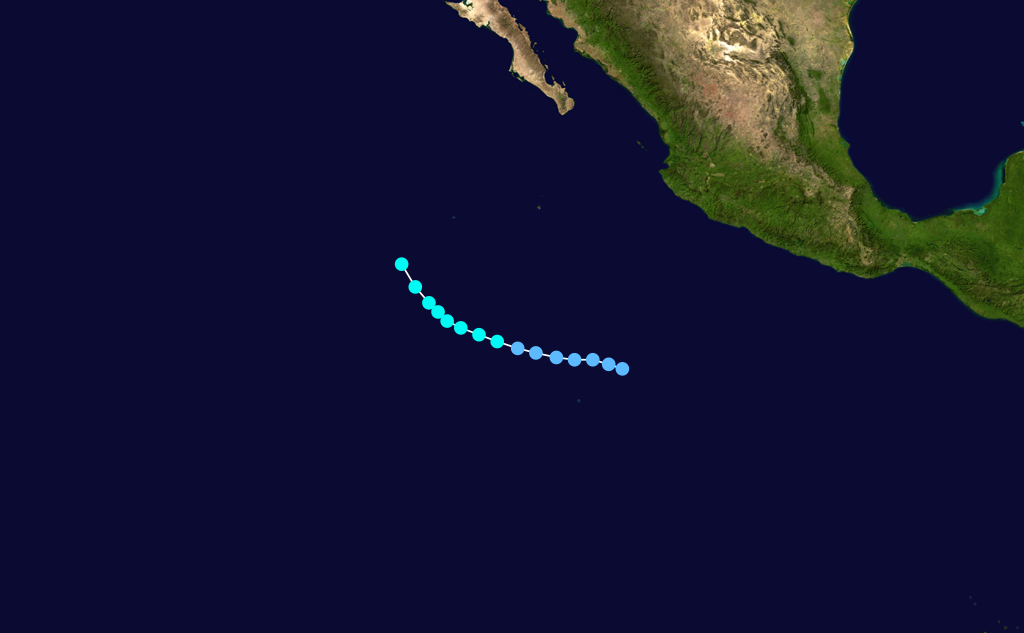
- Duration: June 5 – June 8
- Peak intensity: 60 mph (95 km/h) (1-min); 992 mbar (hPa)

Blanca formed officially on June 5 and dissipated on June 8 due to surface temps being colder than the required 80 °F (27 °C) for tropical activity. Blanca never had a chance to impact land and had it did at its peak intensity, it would have never done much as its peak wind speeds were 60 mph (97 km/h). Blanca also was the 2nd named storm of the season starting the hurricane season off very weakly. The brunt of the season would start 2 months later in late August.

=== Hurricane Connie ===
- Category 3 hurricane (SSHWS)
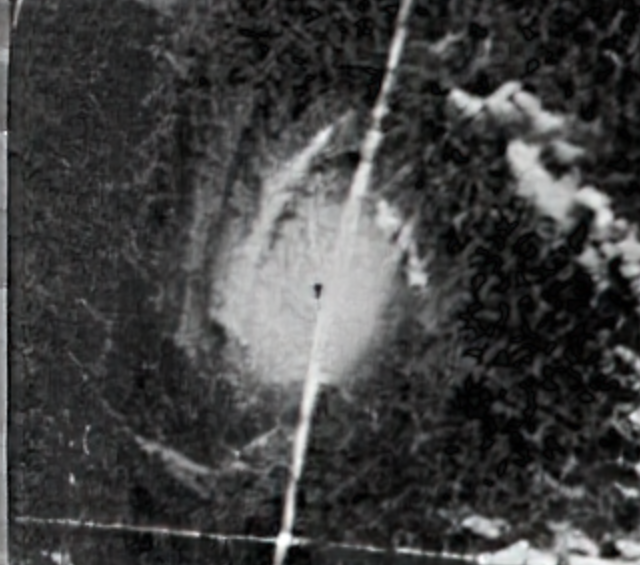
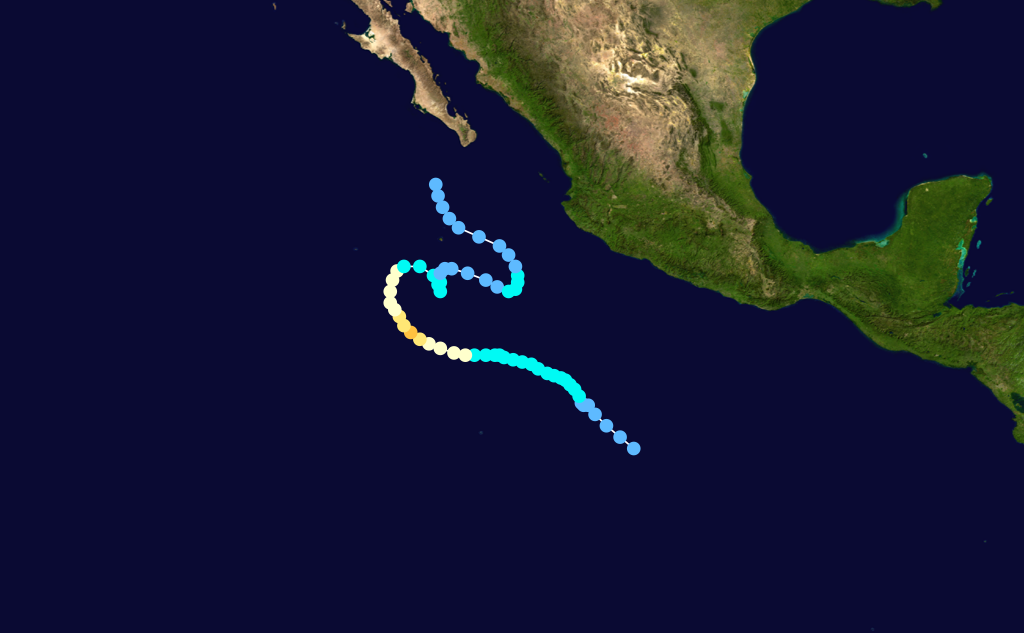
- Duration: June 7 – June 22
- Peak intensity: 125 mph (205 km/h) (1-min); 942 mbar (hPa)

Hurricane Connie was the first major hurricane. It took a bizarre, twisting path but never made landfall. Connie was never expected to make landfall because of where it formed and the path it took. Connie's track was unique with 2 major turns and potentially 1 loop.

=== Hurricane Dolores ===
- Category 1 hurricane (SSHWS)
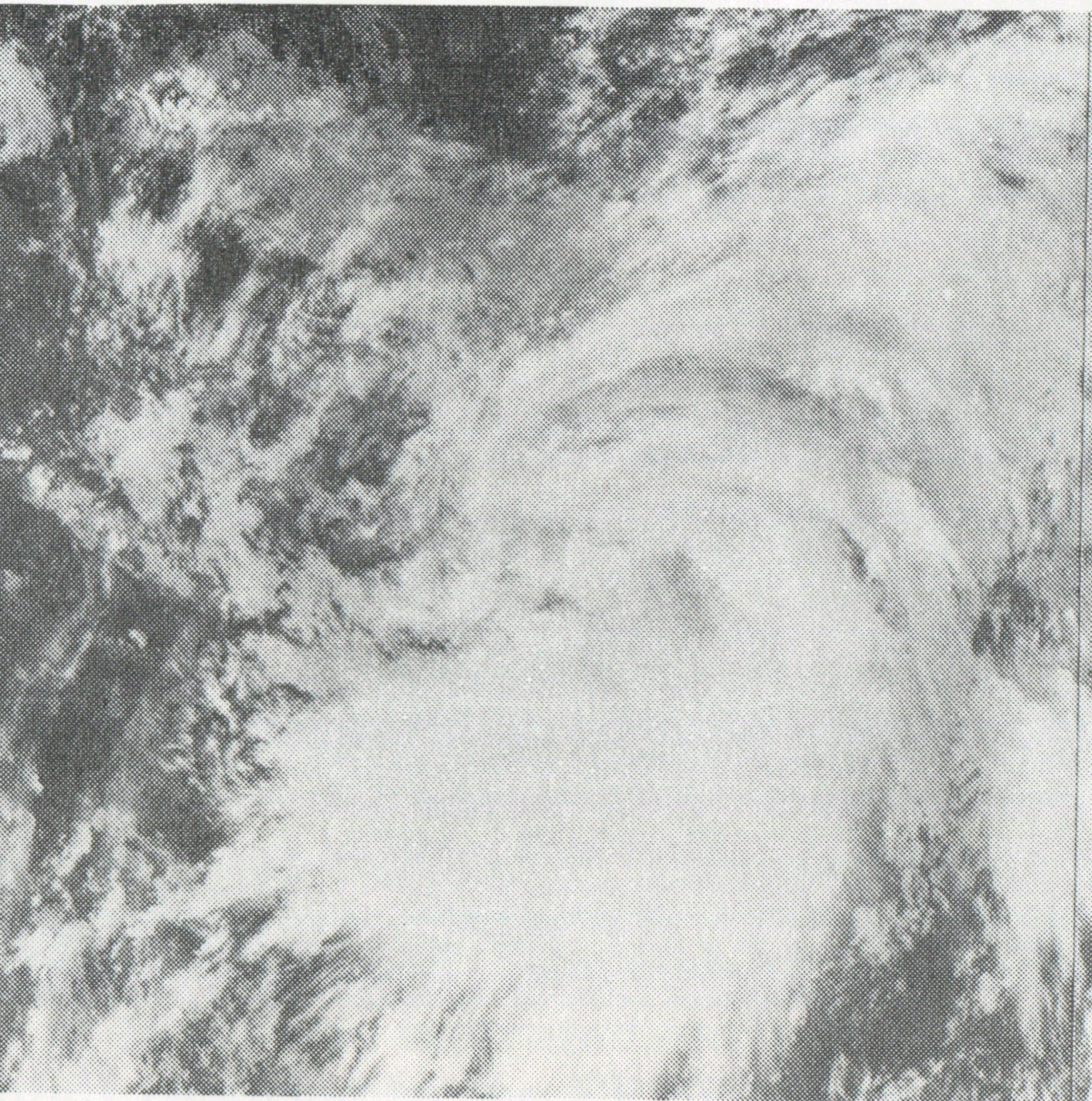
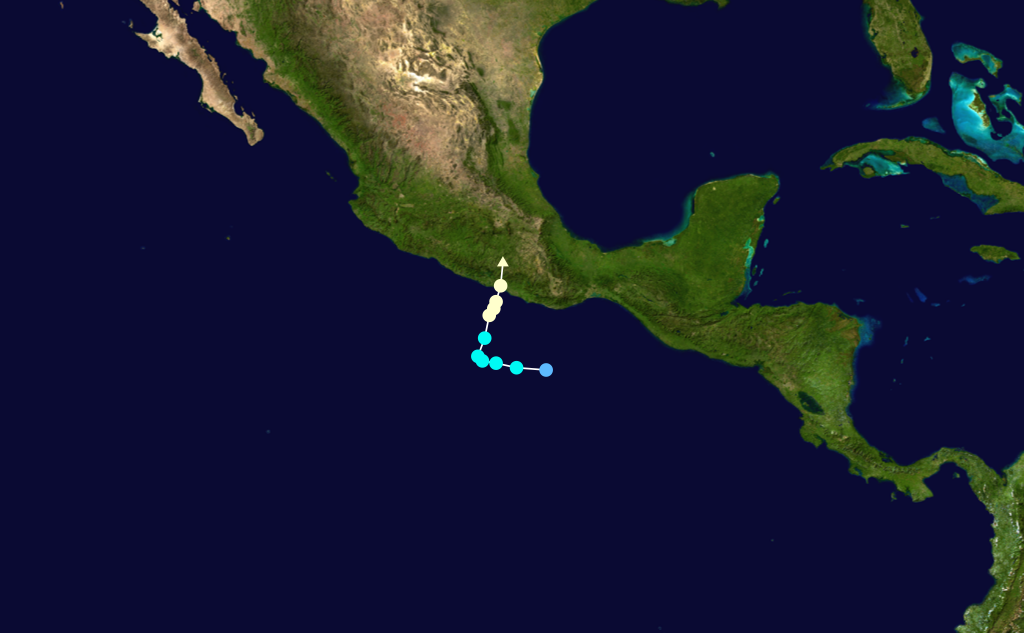
- Duration: June 14 – June 17
- Peak intensity: 80 mph (130 km/h) (1-min); 973 mbar (hPa)

On June 13, a tropical disturbance south of Mexico showed signs of development. The following day, the system rapidly developed into Tropical Storm Dolores. By June 15, an eye-like feature appeared on satellite imagery as Dolores attained hurricane status. With peak winds of 80 mph (130 km/h), the storm made landfall near Acapulco. Once onshore, Dolores rapidly dissipated and was last noted on June 17.

Across Southwestern Mexico, Hurricane Dolores produced heavy rains that triggered widespread flooding and mudslides. Numerous roads sustained damage, separating communities from surrounding areas. At least 18 people were killed and 32 others were injured by the storm. Additionally, an estimated 173,000 people were affected across the country.

=== Tropical Storm Eileen ===
- Tropical storm (SSHWS)
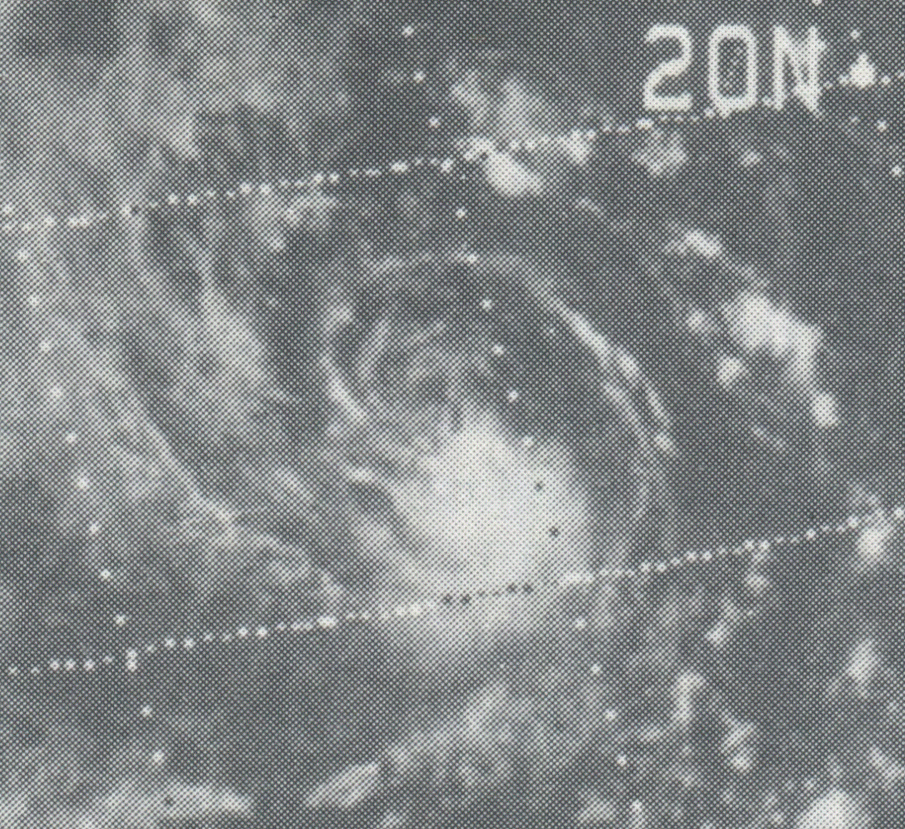
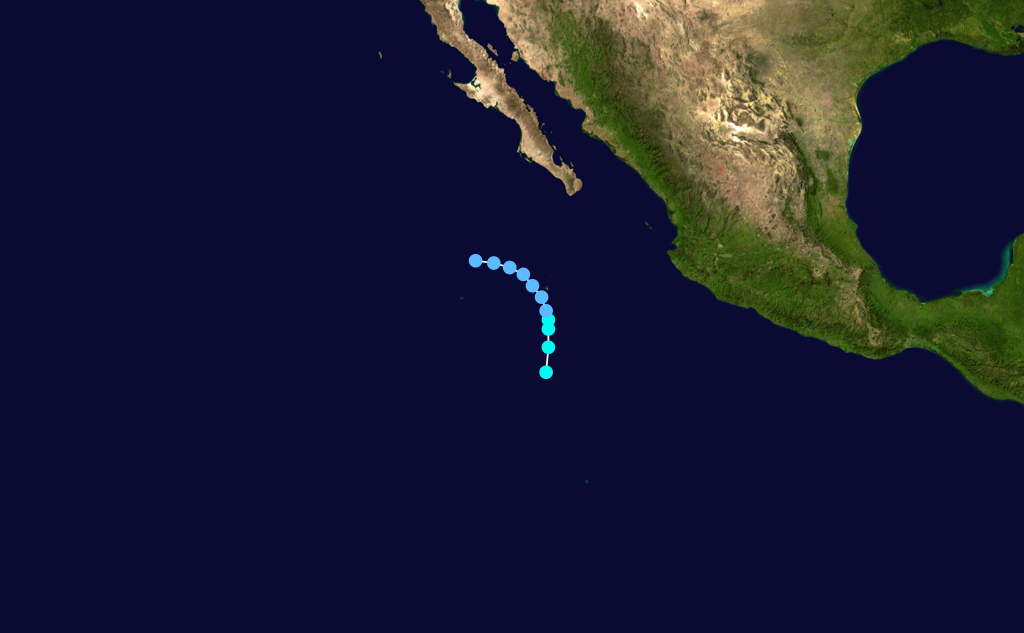
- Duration: June 30 – July 3
- Peak intensity: 40 mph (65 km/h) (1-min); 997 mbar (hPa)

In late June, a tropical disturbance developed well to the southwest of Mexico. By June 30, sufficient convection had developed over a newly formed area of low pressure to warrant advisories on a tropical depression. Tracking northward, the system gradually attained tropical storm intensity. Due to the lack of direct observations, Eileen's intensity was based solely on satellite estimates; these estimates indicated the cyclone to have attained peak winds of 40 mph (64 km/h) and a minimum pressure of 997 mbar (hPa; 29.44 inHg). By July 2, Eileen entered a region of stable air, causing convection to diminish. The storm degenerated into a non-convective low late on July 3 as it turned northwestward. The remnants of Eileen were last noted on July 4 well to the southwest of the southern tip of Baja California.

=== Hurricane Francesca ===
- Category 1 hurricane (SSHWS)
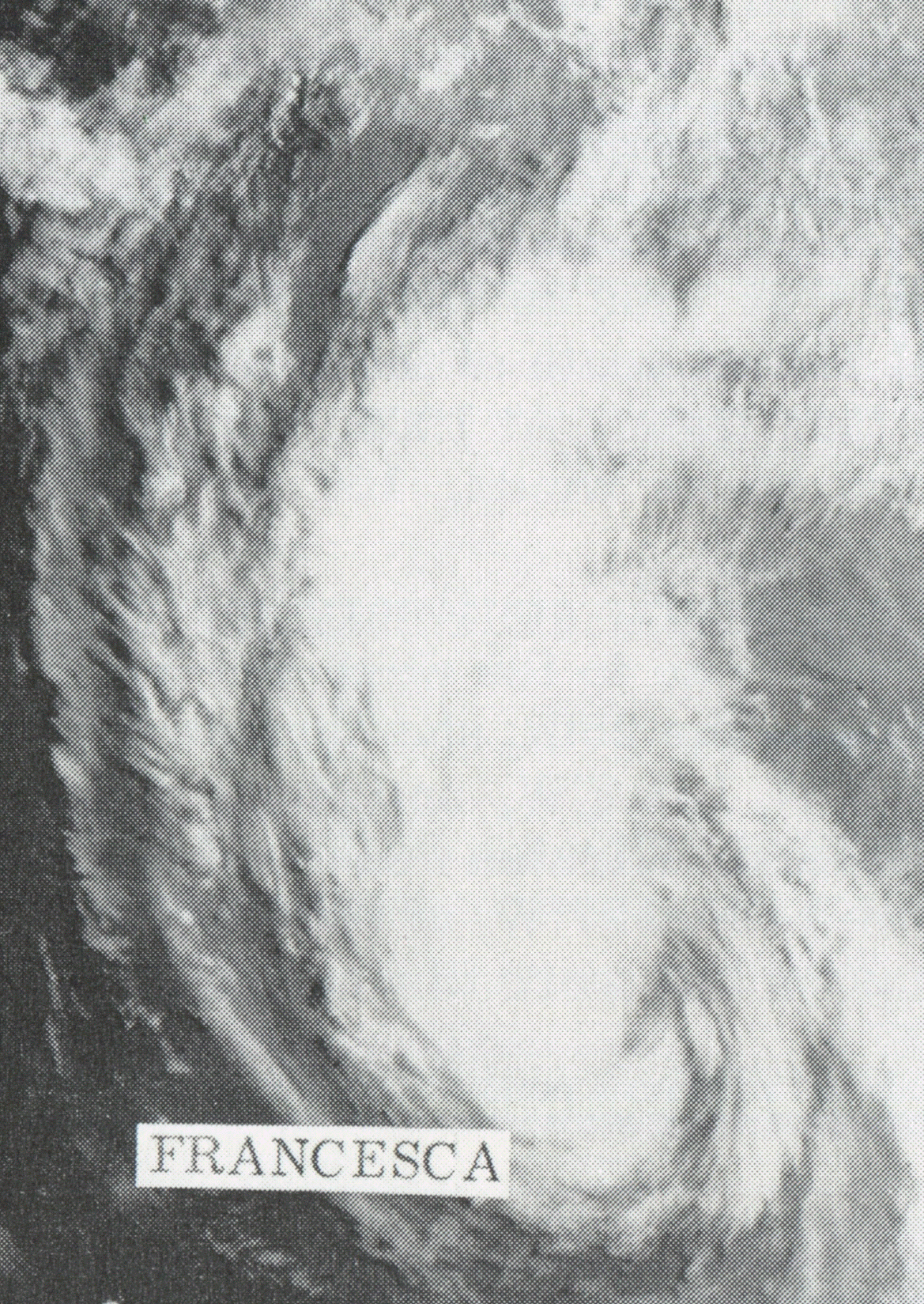
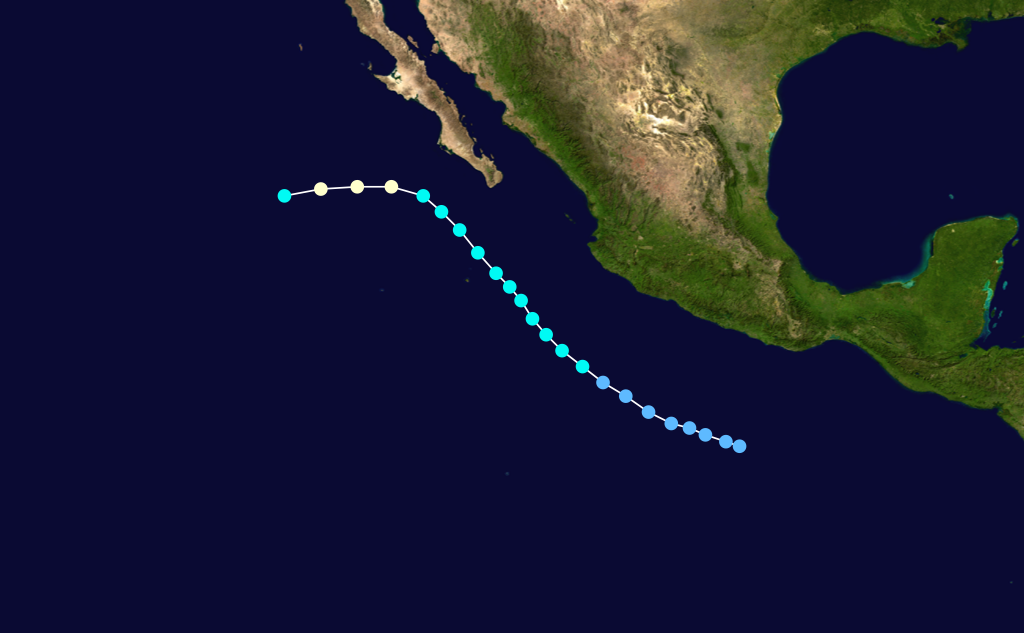
- Duration: July 14 – July 19
- Peak intensity: 80 mph (130 km/h) (1-min); 973 mbar (hPa)

Francesca was a category 1 hurricane. It neared Baja California by the 17th but turned away before striking.

=== Hurricane Gretchen ===
- Category 2 hurricane (SSHWS)
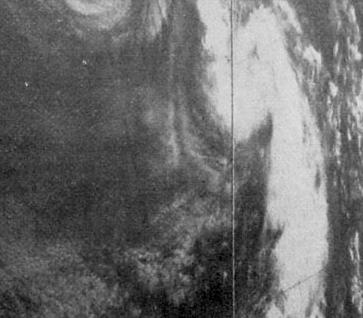
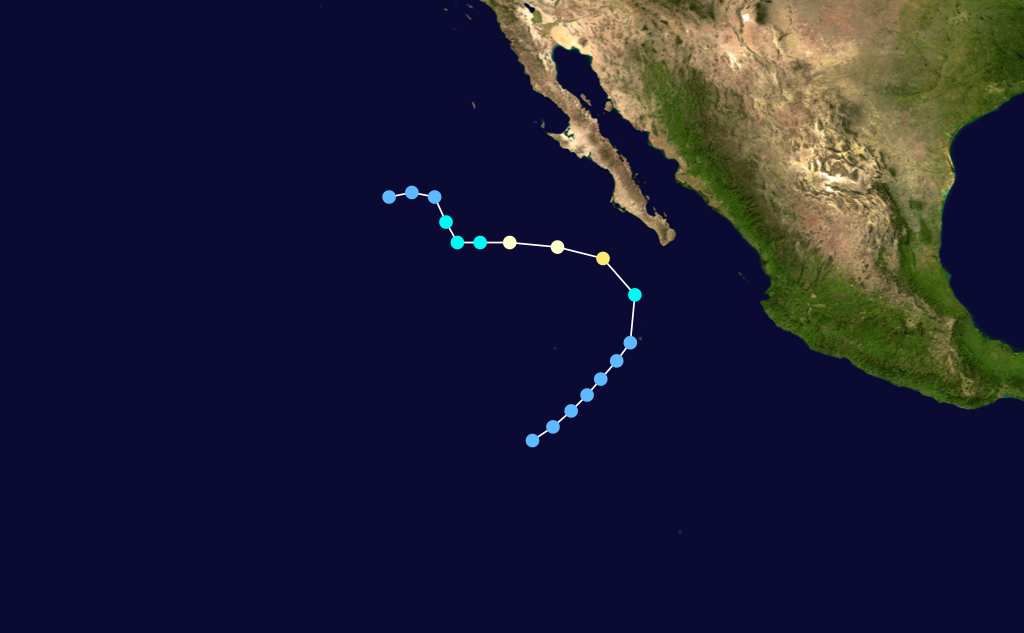
- Duration: July 17 – July 21
- Peak intensity: 100 mph (155 km/h) (1-min); 982 mbar (hPa)

Gretchen was a category 2 hurricane that threatened southern Baja California, but it turned away without affecting land.

=== Tropical Storm Helga ===
- Tropical storm (SSHWS)
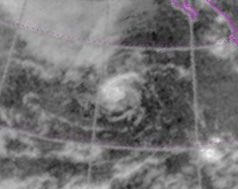
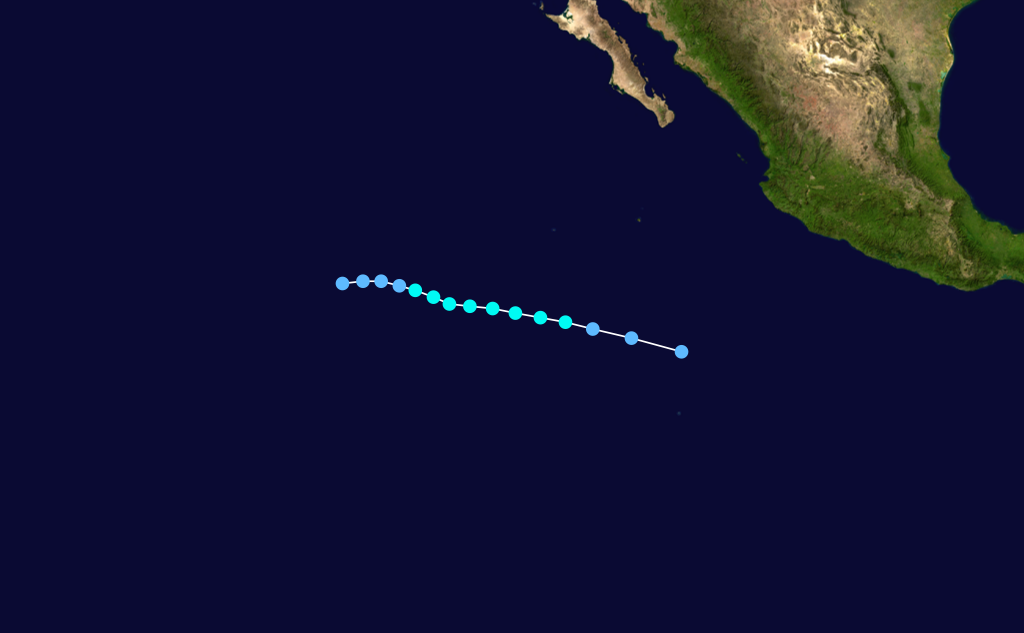
- Duration: August 10 – August 13
- Peak intensity: 45 mph (75 km/h) (1-min); 990 mbar (hPa)

Helga was a storm that did not affect land.

=== Hurricane Ione ===
- Category 3 hurricane (SSHWS)
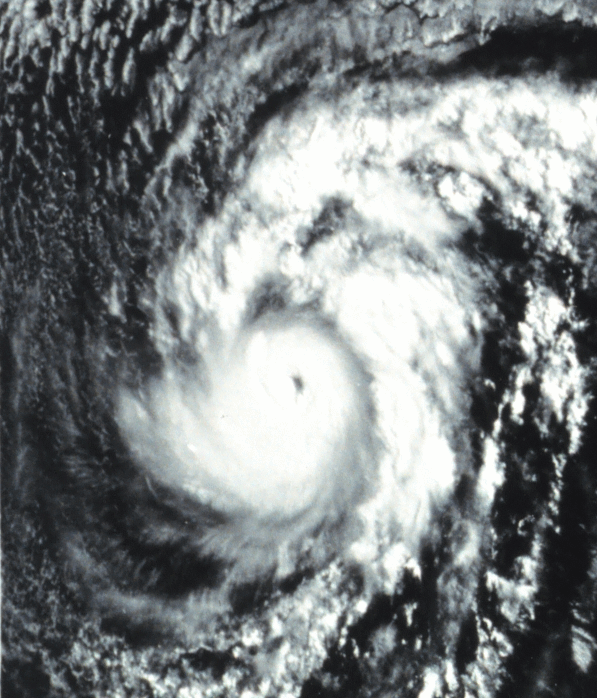
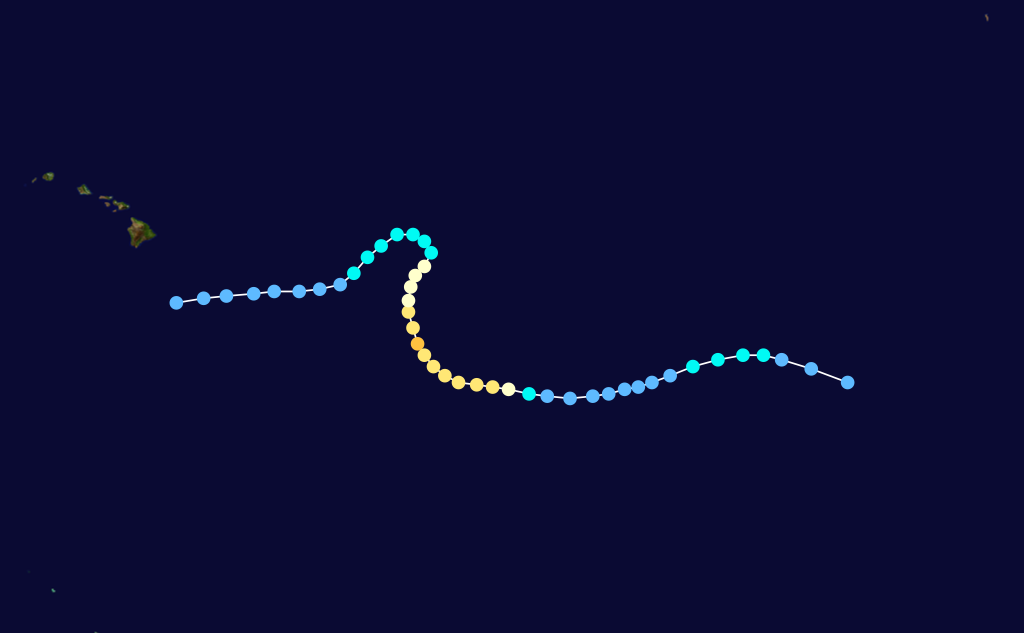
- Duration: August 20 – August 31
- Peak intensity: 115 mph (185 km/h) (1-min); 954 mbar (hPa)

On August 19, a tropical disturbance was identified near the Intertropical Convergence Zone well to the east-southeast of Hawaii. The next morning, the system developed into a tropical depression as it tracked towards the west-northwest. Later on August 20, the depression intensified into Tropical Storm Ione. However, cold air from a nearby stratocumulus field became entrained in Ione's circulation, causing it to weaken to a depression 24 hours later. Now moving towards the west-southwest, the system remained weak for nearly two days. On August 23, Ione rapidly intensified as convection deepened and an eye feature appeared on satellite imagery. The storm subsequently attained hurricane status that evening before crossing 140°W and entering the Central Pacific.

Intensification slowed on August 24 as Ione attained winds in excess of 100 mph (160 km/h). Over the next day, the system turned northward and attained its peak intensity late on August 25 with winds of 115 mph (185 km/h). Additionally, the storm attained an estimated minimum central pressure of 954 mbar (hPa; 28.17 inHg). Shortly after reaching this intensity, Ione weakened as it began a U-shaped curve, tracking northeast before turning towards the southwest. During the afternoon of August 27, the system was downgraded to a tropical storm. By August 29, Ione further weakened to a tropical depression and acquired a westward track before dissipating south of Hawaii on August 31.

=== Tropical Storm Olive ===
- Tropical storm (SSHWS)
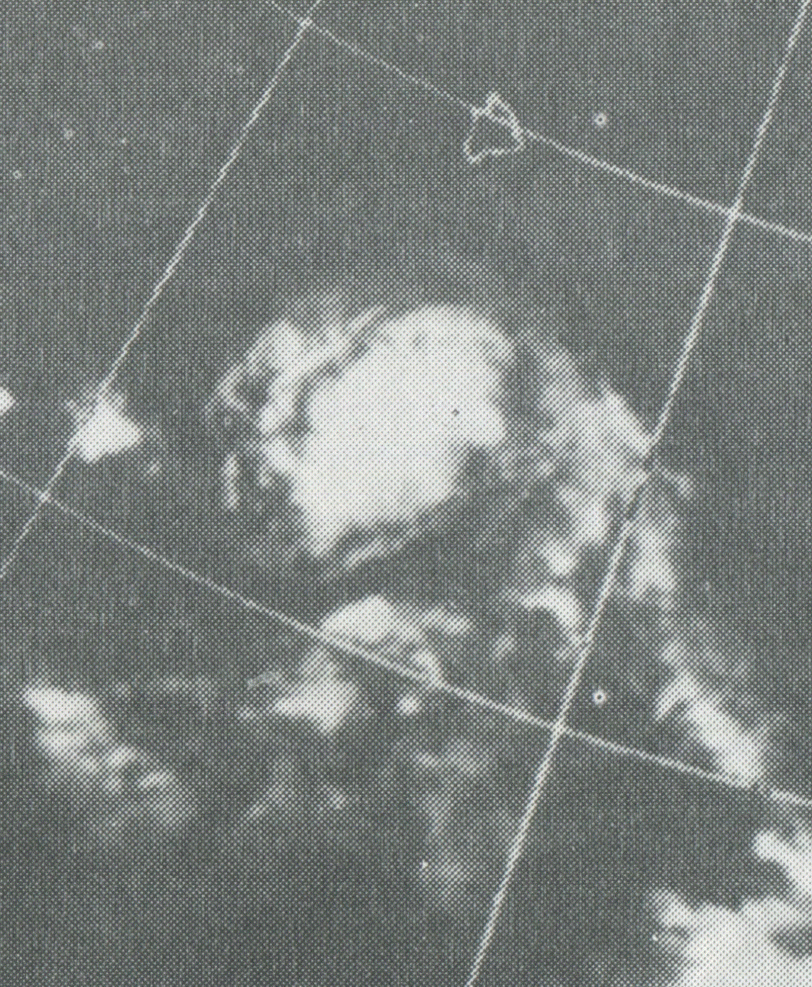
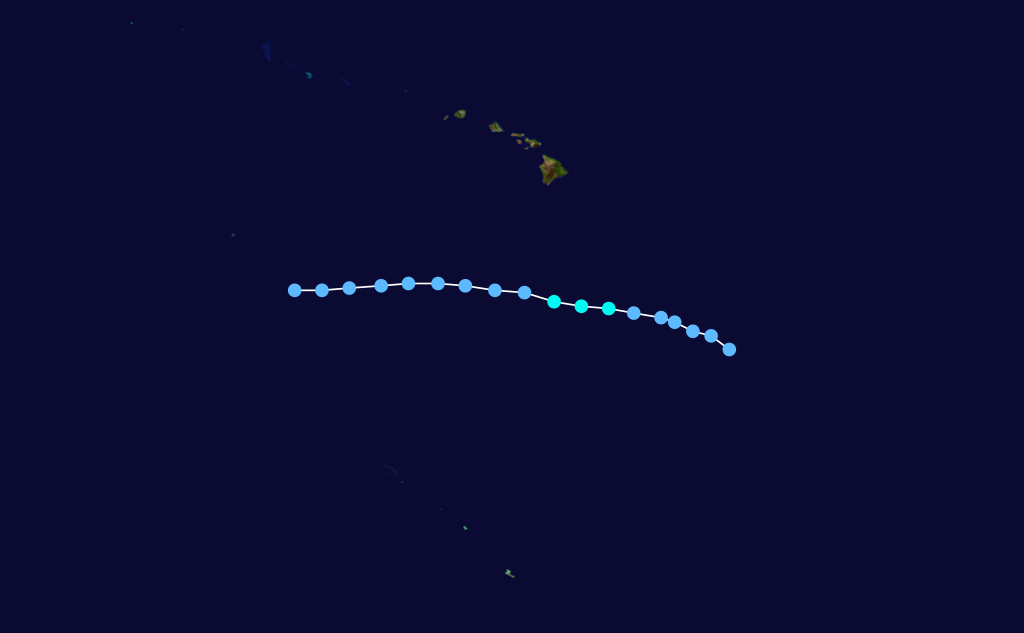
- Duration: August 22 – August 25
- Peak intensity: 45 mph (75 km/h) (1-min); 1009 mbar (hPa)

On August 21, just one day after Ione formed, another disturbance formed along the ITCZ and developed into a tropical depression the following day. Tracking generally towards the west, the system slowly organized. By August 23, the depression intensified into Tropical Storm Olive well to the south of Hawaii. Olive briefly attained winds of 45 mph (72 km/h) before weakening to a tropical depression on August 24. Convection waned for the next 30 hours and Olive degenerated into a disturbance on August 25. The remnant vortex of the storm was last noted on August 26 roughly 210 mi (340 km) southeast of Johnston Island.

=== Hurricane Joyce ===
- Category 1 hurricane (SSHWS)
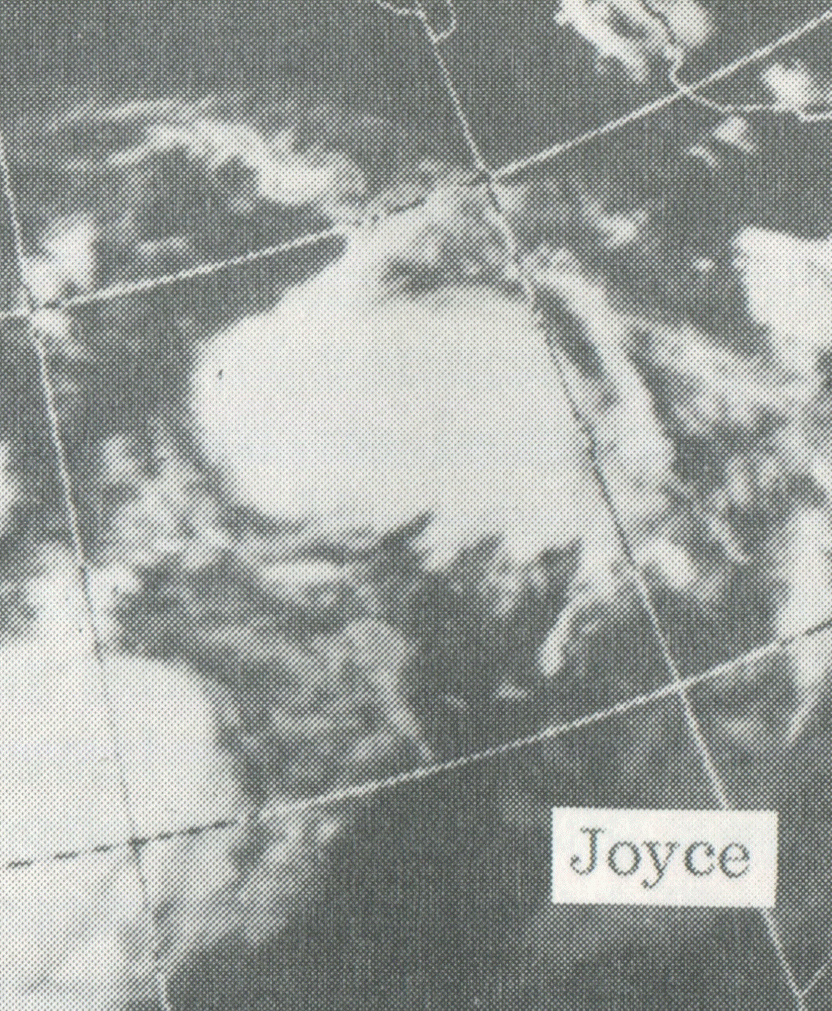
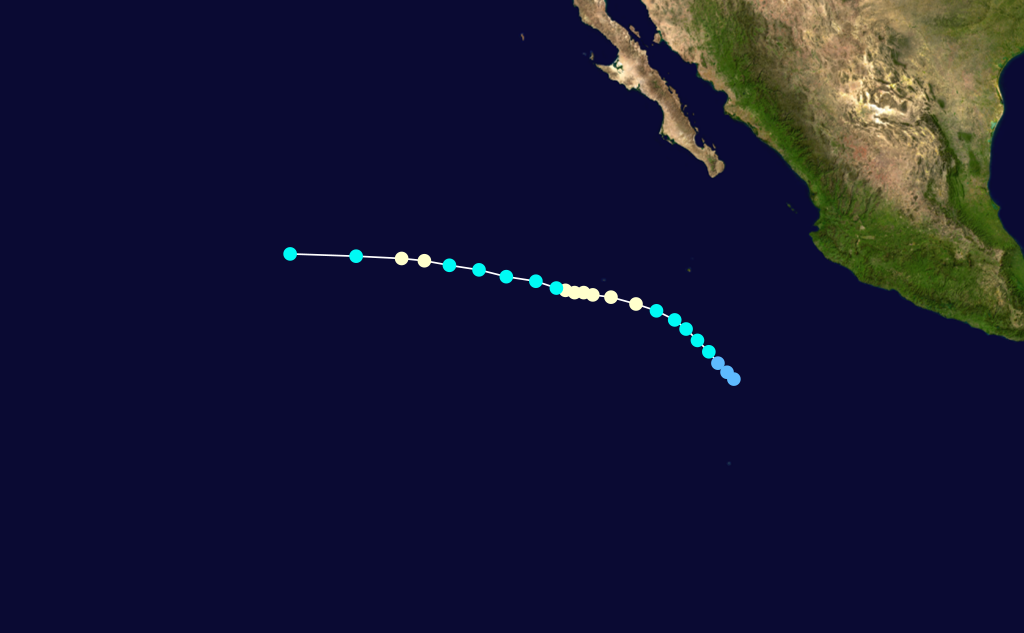
- Duration: August 22 – August 27
- Peak intensity: 85 mph (140 km/h) (1-min); 973 mbar (hPa)

Joyce was a weak hurricane that did not affect land.

=== Hurricane Kirsten ===
- Category 1 hurricane (SSHWS)
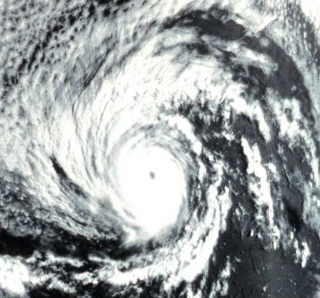
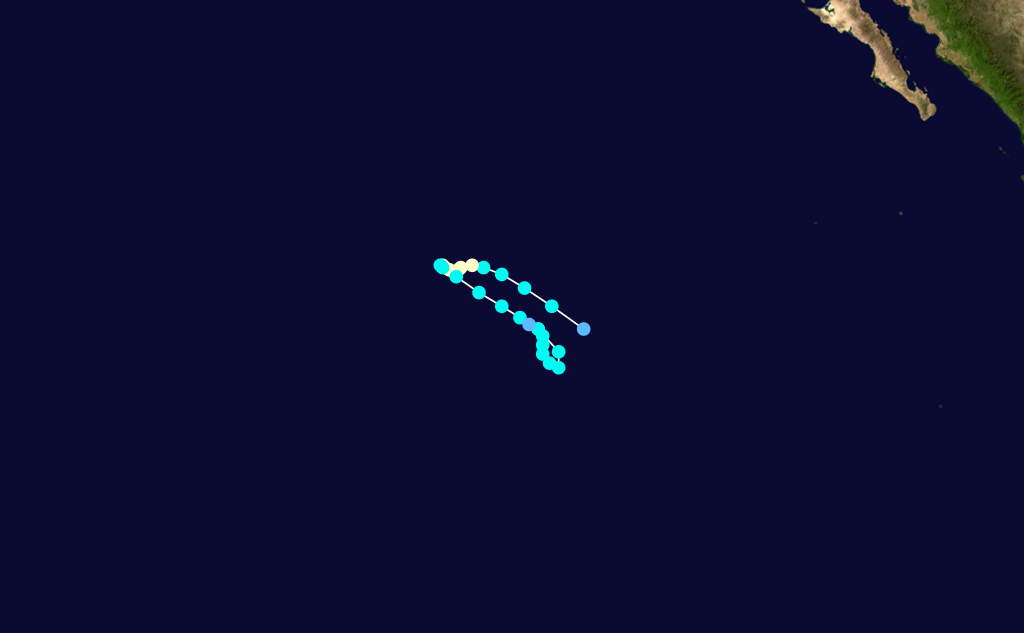
- Duration: August 22 – August 29
- Peak intensity: 85 mph (140 km/h) (1-min); 973 mbar (hPa)

Hurricane Kirsten took an erratic path. After traveling northwest for a while, it reversed direction and backtracked to almost where it started. It then reversed direction again and underwent a Fujiwhara interaction with Hurricane Ione.

=== Tropical Storm Lorraine ===
- Tropical storm (SSHWS)
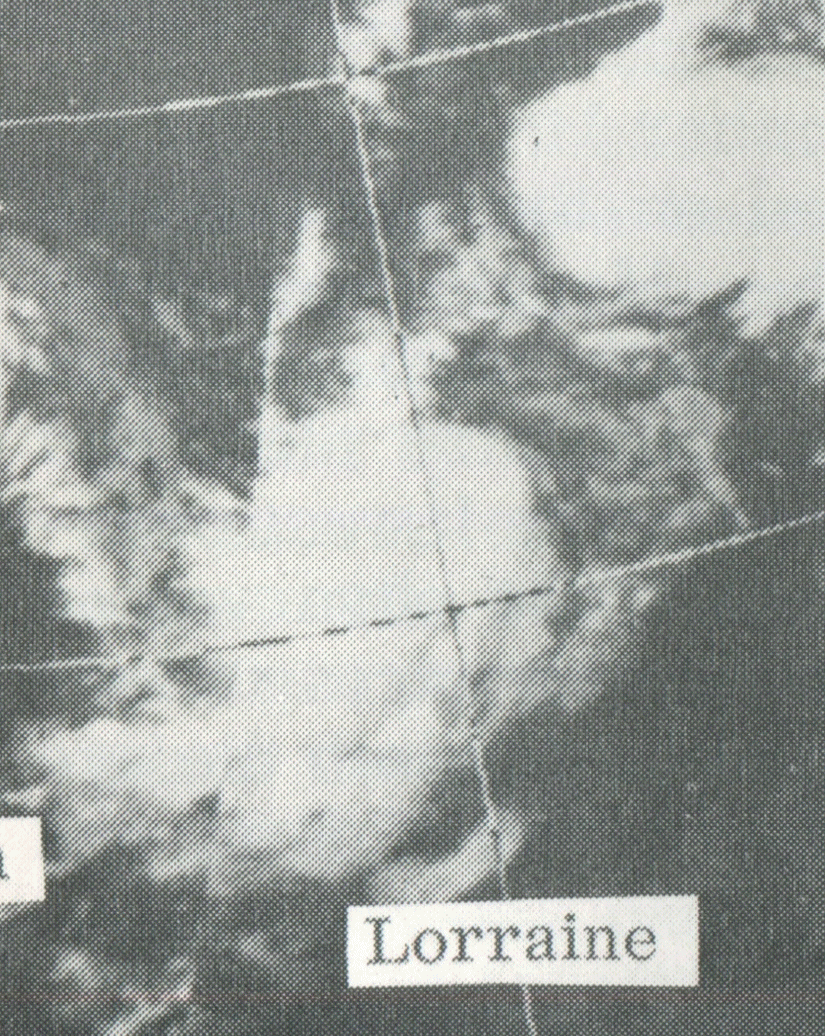
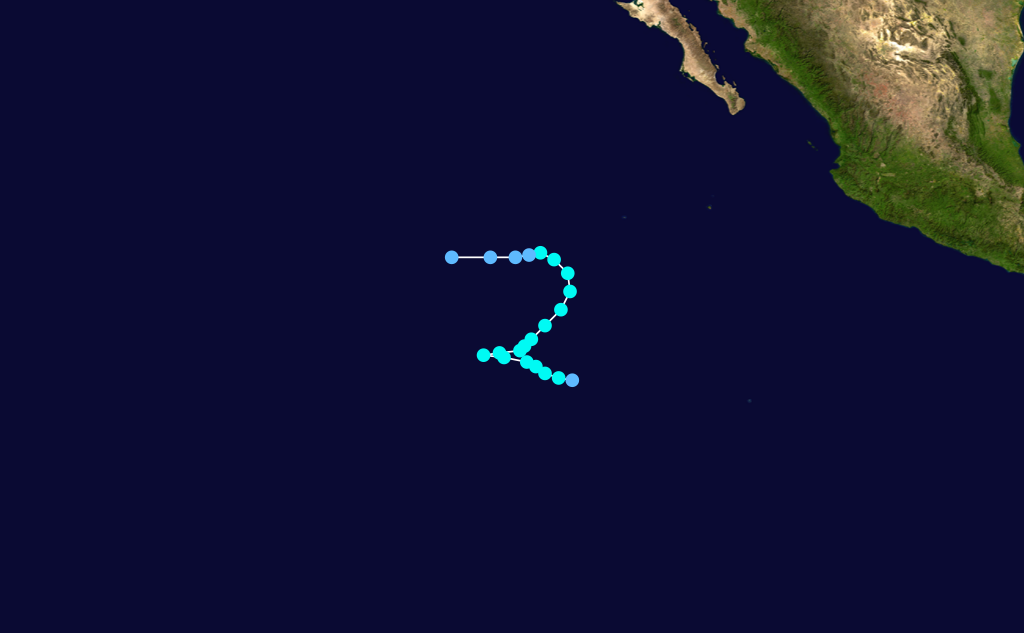
- Duration: August 23 – August 28
- Peak intensity: 50 mph (85 km/h) (1-min); 987 mbar (hPa)

Tropical Storm Lorraine took an erratic, Z-shaped path during its life. It formed on August 23 and dissipated August 28.

=== Hurricane Maggie ===
- Category 4 hurricane (SSHWS)
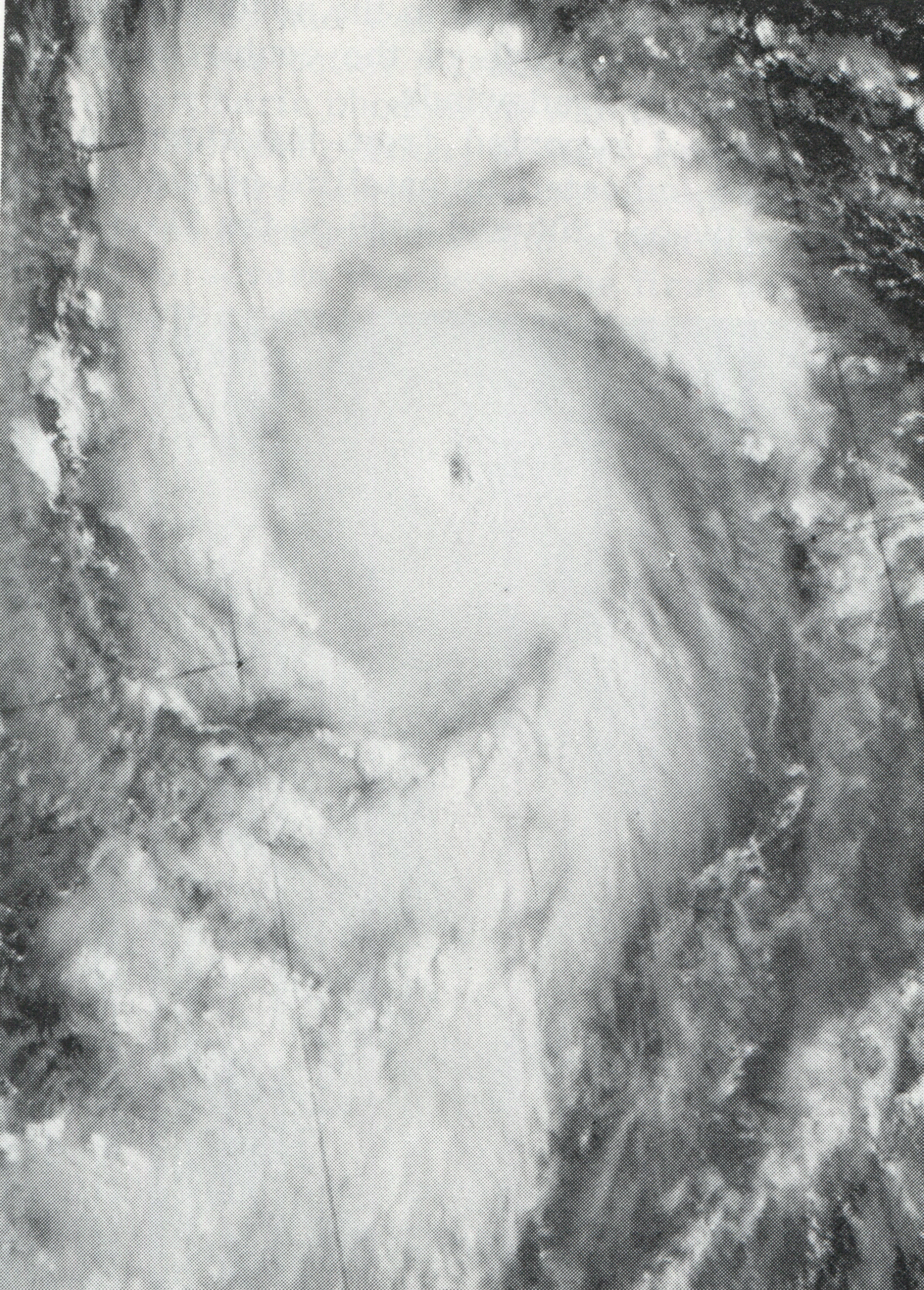
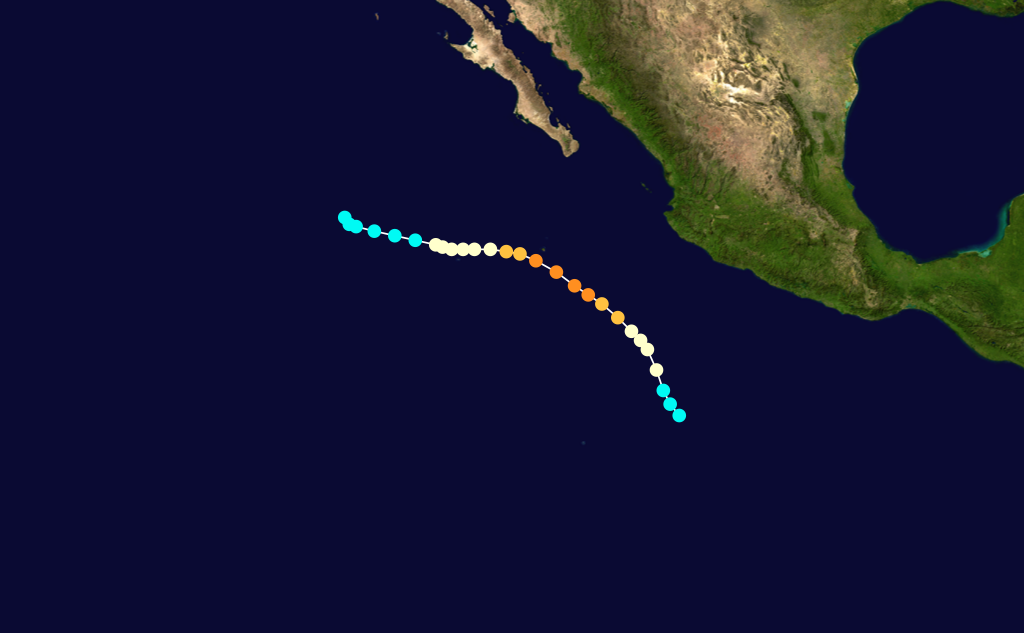
- Duration: August 26 – September 1
- Peak intensity: 140 mph (220 km/h) (1-min); 928 mbar (hPa)

Hurricane Maggie was the strongest storm of the season. It reached Category 4 but never threatened land.

=== Hurricane Norma ===
- Category 1 hurricane (SSHWS)
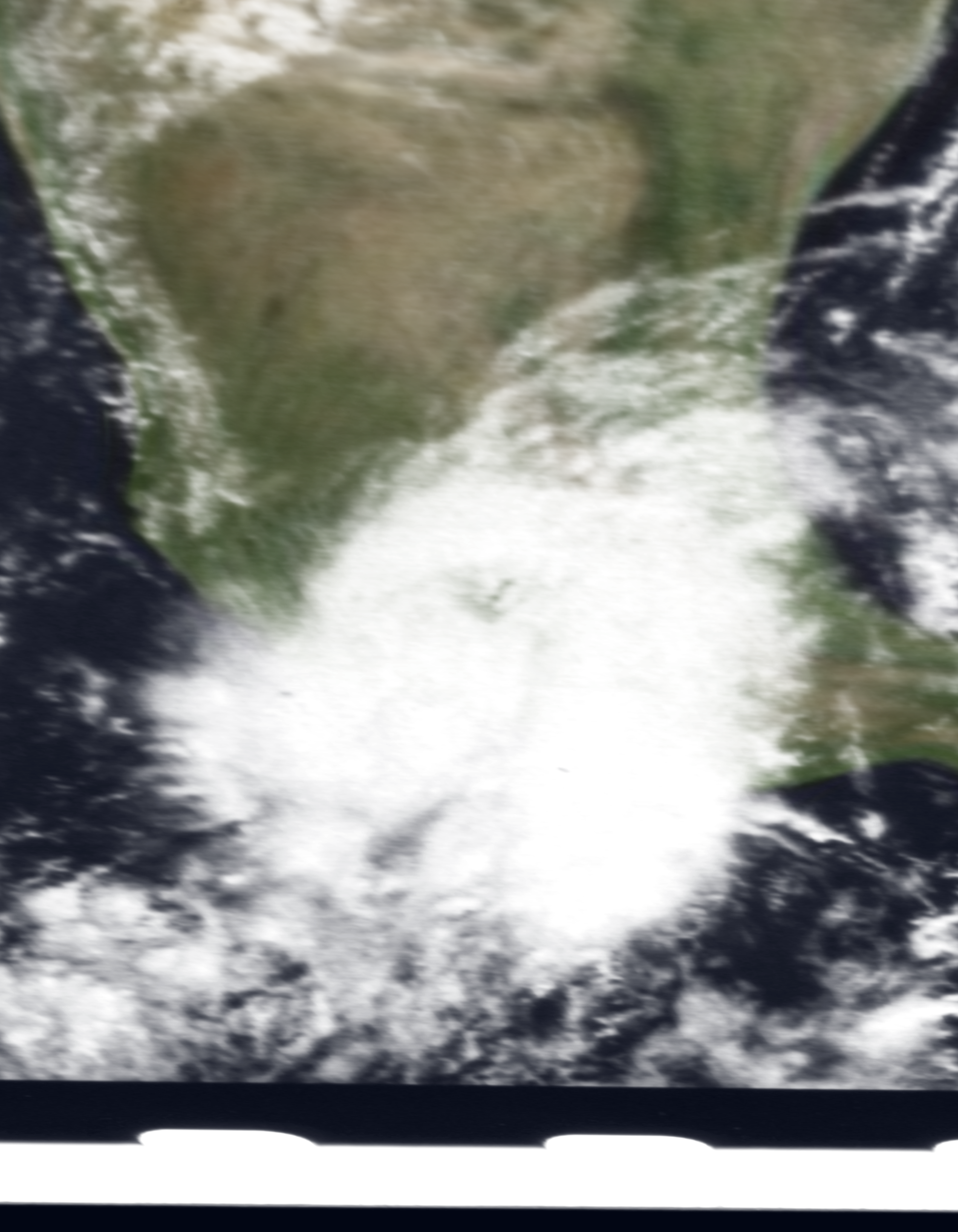
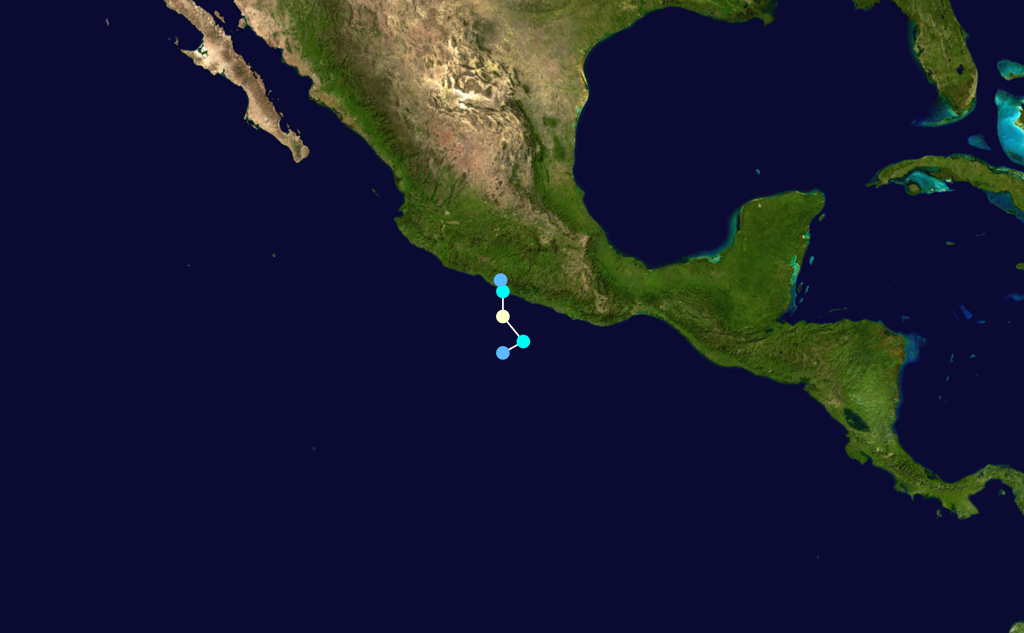
- Duration: September 9 – September 10
- Peak intensity: 75 mph (120 km/h) (1-min); 987 mbar (hPa)

On September 7, a large area of thunderstorms was identified southwest of Mexico. Over the following two days, the system gradually organized as it moved northwest and was declared a tropical depression on September 9. Upon being classified a depression, the storm acquired a more northerly track and soon attained tropical storm status. The newly christened Tropical Storm Norma maintained a general northward track towards Mexico. On September 10, Norma briefly strengthened into a hurricane, with peak winds estimated at 75 mph (121 km/h) before making landfall west of Acapulco. Within hours of moving onshore, the storm rapidly deteriorated and dissipated later that day.

Heavy rains produced by Norma triggered mudslides in and around Acapulco, resulting in three fatalities.

=== Hurricane Orlene ===
- Category 2 hurricane (SSHWS)
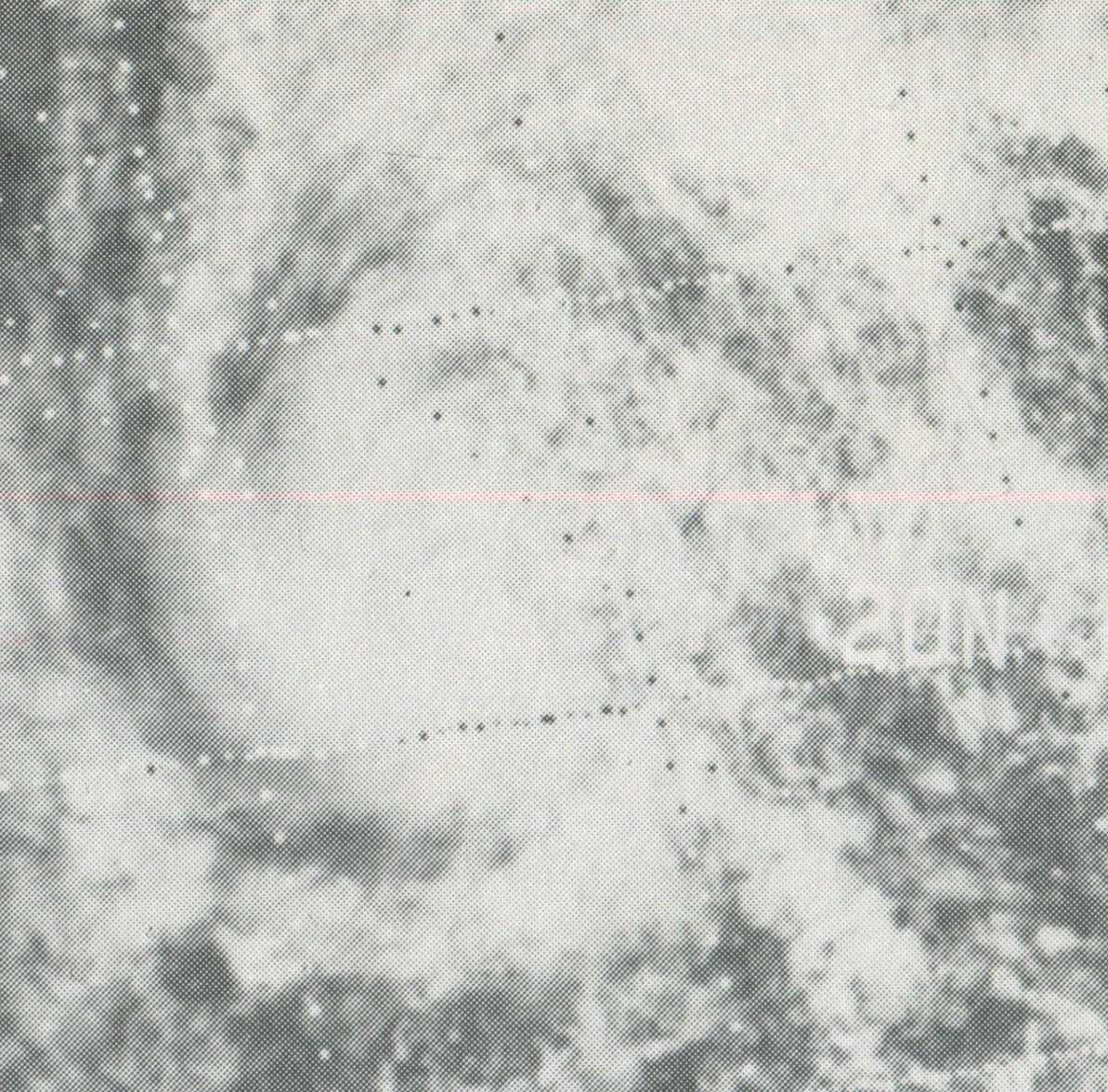
- Duration: September 22 – September 24
- Peak intensity: 105 mph (165 km/h) (1-min); 978 mbar (hPa)

On September 19, Category 2 Hurricane Fifi made landfall in Placencia, Belize just below its peak intensity, becoming the third deadliest Atlantic hurricane on record. Fifi rapidly weakened over land, and dissipated over land on late September 21. A day later, a large-scale circulation associated with Fifi's remnants led to the formation of a system that would later become Tropical Storm Orlene. Orlene gradually intensified as it hugged the coast of Western Mexico, becoming a hurricane again on September 23 as it began recurving to the north-northeast. Orlene reached Category 2 intensity as a small eye developed and the storm made landfall at peak intensity in northwestern Mexico. It rapidly weakened over land and became a remnant low just six hours after landfall. The low continued for several more hours before dissipating over the mountains of Northern Mexico.

There were no reports of casualties or major damage in Mexico from Orlene, although reports from Acapulco indicated that 11 in (280 mm) of rain fell within a six-hour span on September 22. Remnant moisture from the hurricane brought minor rainfall to portions of Arizona as well.

=== Hurricane Patricia ===
- Category 1 hurricane (SSHWS)
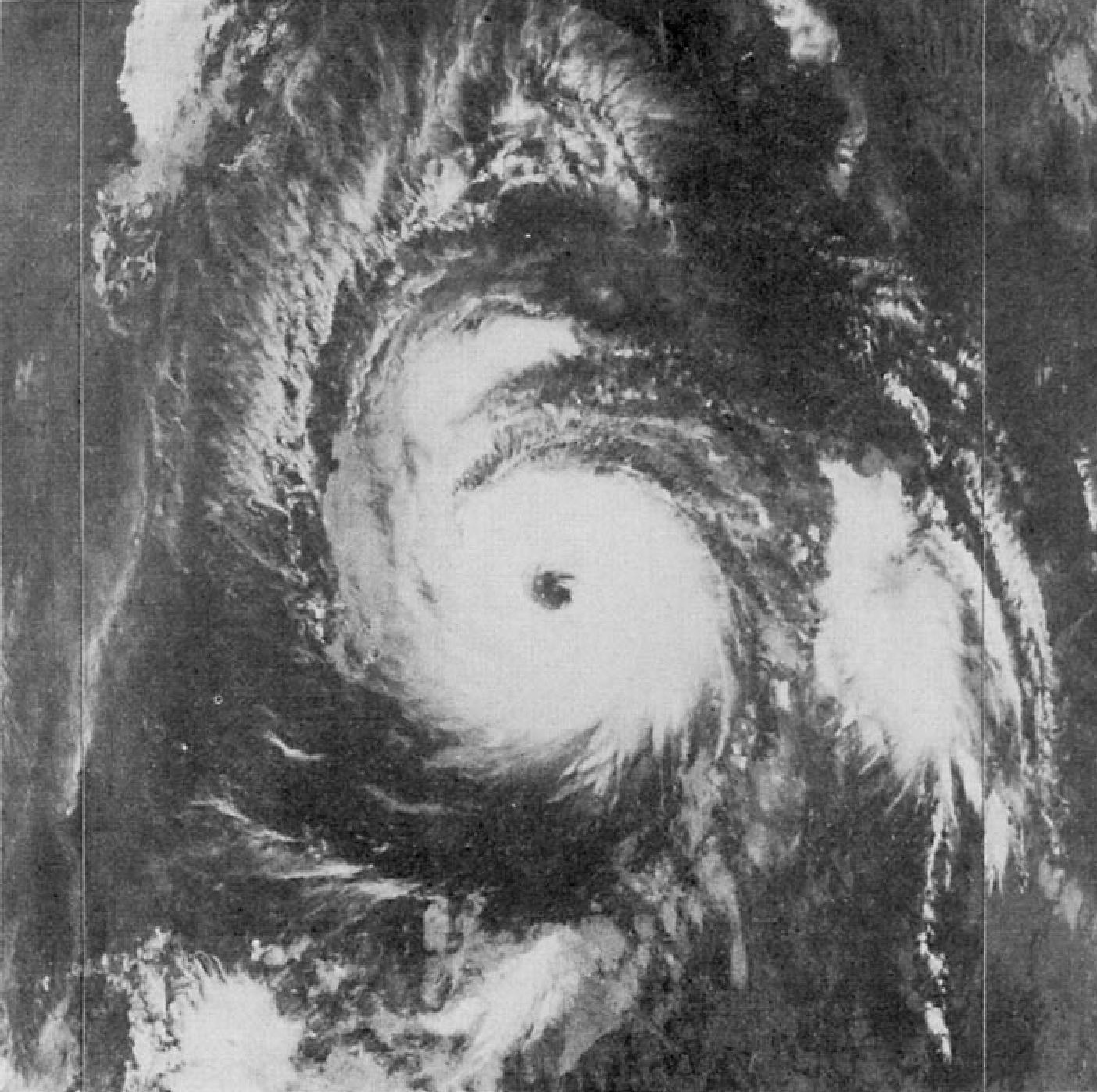
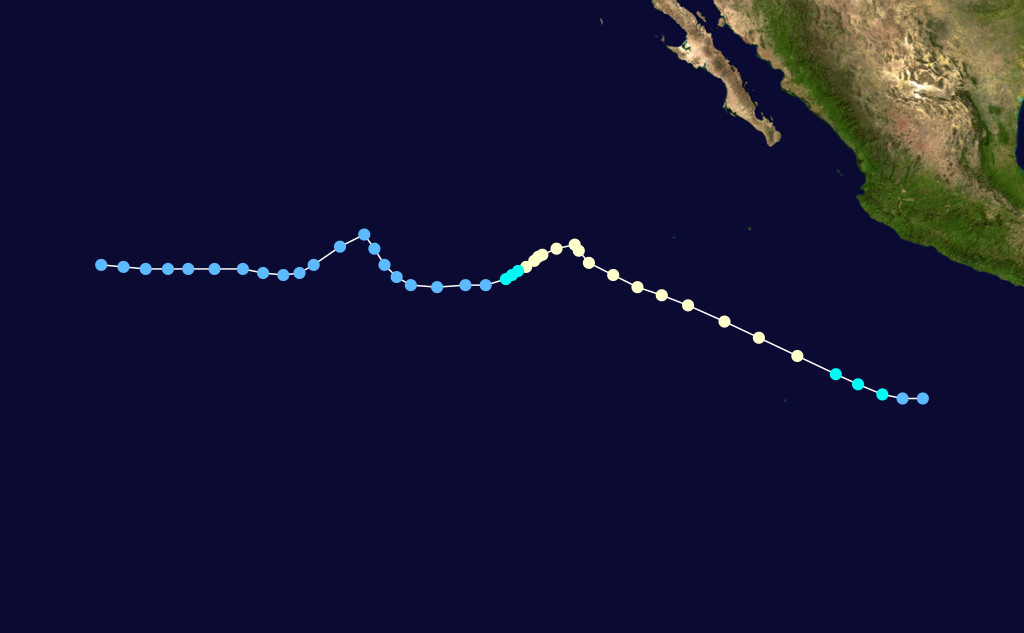
- Duration: October 4 – October 15
- Peak intensity: 90 mph (150 km/h) (1-min); 964 mbar (hPa)

On October 3, an area of disturbed weather was identified several hundred miles southwest of El Salvador. Over the following day, an area of low pressure developed within the disturbance and was subsequently declared a tropical depression. Tracking west-northwestward, the depression eventually intensified into Tropical Storm Patricia on October 6 in light of a significant in convection. The next day, a ragged eye developed and the storm strengthened into a hurricane. Intensification continued through the evening of October 9, at which time Patricia attained its peak intensity with winds estimated at 90 mph (140 km/h). (Note: The peak intensity of Patricia is based on the values listed in the season's Monthly Weather Review. According to the Hurricane Database, the storm attained peak winds of 90 mph (140 km/h) and a minimum pressure of 964 mbar (hPa; 28.47 inHg).) Within a day of peaking, the hurricane turned southwestward and weakened. Gradual degradation of the storm took place over the next few days with little convection present over the system by October 11. By then, Patricia had weakened to a tropical depression. On October 15, Patricia was declassified a tropical cyclone as only a low-level circulation devoid of convection remained. The remnants of the storm were last noted on October 17 well to the east-southeast of Hawaii.

=== Tropical Storm Rosalie ===
- Tropical storm (SSHWS)
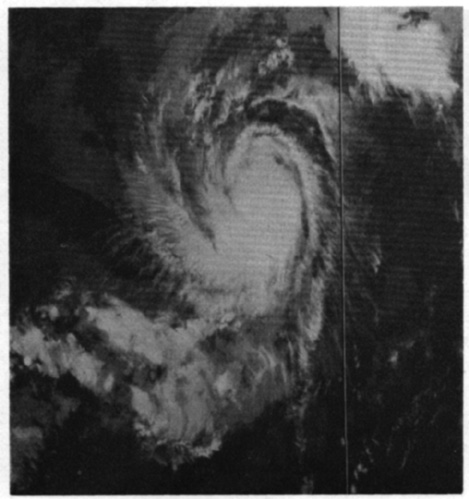
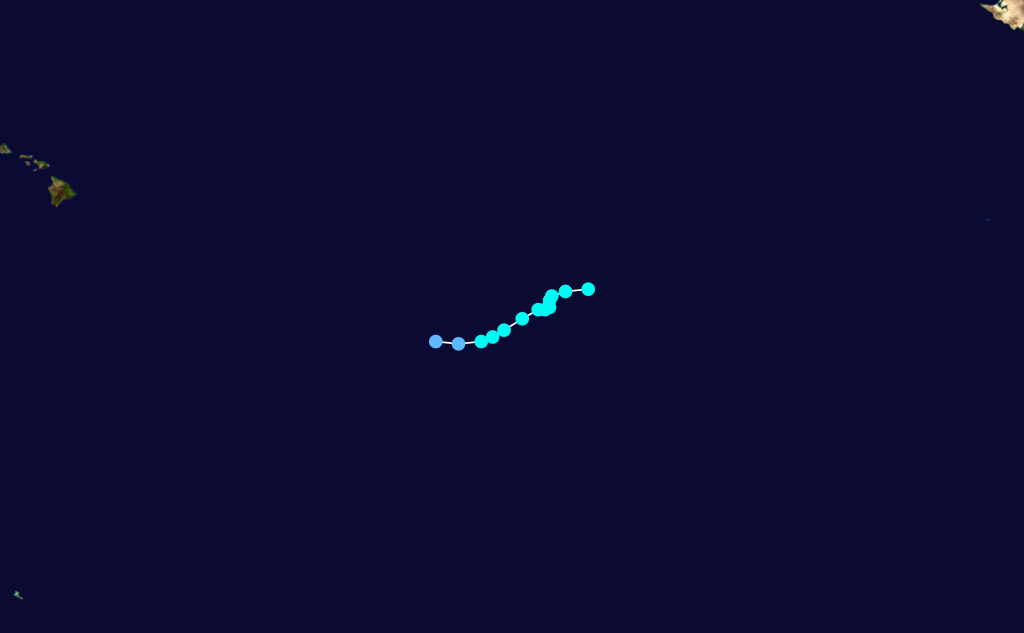
- Duration: October 20 – October 24
- Peak intensity: 65 mph (100 km/h) (1-min); 987 mbar (hPa)

On October 18, pronounced thunderstorm activity developed along the ITCZ. Gradually, a tropical disturbance formed within this region well to the west-southwest of Mexico. During the morning of October 20, convection rapidly increased and the system was classified as Tropical Storm Rosalie. Visible satellite imagery revealed only an "oval-shaped" area of thunderstorms with no banding features. Tracking generally towards the west-southwest, Rosalie attained its peak intensity with winds estimated around 65 mph (105 km/h) on October 21. Later that day, the system neared an area of more stable air. Gradual weakening ensued over the following days, with Rosalie degrading to tropical depression status on October 23. Void of convection, the remnant swirl of Rosalie was last noted on October 24 well to the southeast of Hawaii.

=== Other systems ===
In addition to the eighteen named storms, there were seven tropical depression during the course of the season.

- July 9 – 13, 35 mph (56 km/h)
- July 18 – 20, 35 mph (56 km/h)
- July 21 – 26, 35 mph (56 km/h)
- July 31 – August 11, 35 mph (56 km/h), 1001 mbar (hPa; 29.56 inHg)
- August 5 – 7, 35 mph (56 km/h)
- September 3 – 7, 35 mph (56 km/h), 1001 mbar (hPa; 29.56 inHg)
- October 14 – 15, 30 mph (48 km/h), 1004 mbar (hPa; 29.65 inHg)

== Storm names ==
The following list of names was used for named storms that formed in the North Pacific Ocean east of 140°W in 1974. It was the same list used during the 1970 season, except for Aletta and Kirsten, which replaced Adele and Kristen, respectively. No names were retired following the season; however, an overhaul of the naming system in 1978 to include male names resulted in this list being discarded.

- Aletta
- Blanca
- Connie
- Dolores
- Eileen
- Francesca
- Gretchen
- Helga
- Ione *
- Joyce
- Kirsten
- Lorraine
- Maggie
- Norma
- Orlene
- Patricia
- Rosalie
- Selma (unused)
- Toni (unused)
- Vivian (unused)
- Winona (unused)

One named storm, listed below, formed in the North Pacific between 140°W and the International Date Line in 1974. At the time, storm names within this region were assigned by the Joint Typhoon Warning Center on Guam. Any named storm in the table above that crossed into the area during the season is noted (*).

- Olive

== Season effects ==
This is a table of all of the storms that formed in the 1974 Pacific hurricane season. It includes their name, duration, peak classification and intensities, areas affected, damage, and death totals. Deaths in parentheses are additional and indirect (an example of an indirect death would be a traffic accident), but were still related to that storm. Damage and deaths include totals while the storm was extratropical, a wave, or a low, and all of the damage figures are in 1974 USD.

Saffir–Simpson scale
| TD | TS | C1 | C2 | C3 | C4 | C5 |

1974 Pacific hurricane season statistics
| Storm name | Dates active | Storm category at peak intensity | Max 1-min wind mph (km/h) | Min. press. (mbar) | Areas affected | Damage (US$) | Deaths | Ref(s). |
|---|---|---|---|---|---|---|---|---|
| Aletta | May 28 – 29 | Tropical storm | 60 (95) | 992 | None | None | 0 | |
| Blanca | June 5 – 8 | Tropical storm | 60 (95) | 992 | None | None | 0 | |
| Connie | June 7 – 22 | Category 3 hurricane | 125 (205) | 942 | None | None | 0 | |
| Dolores | June 14 – 17 | Category 1 hurricane | 80 (130) | 973 | Southwestern Mexico (Guerrero) | 4 | 18 – 28 | |
| Eileen | June 30 – July 3 | Tropical storm | 40 (65) | 997 | None | None | 0 | |
| Depression | July 9 – 13 | Tropical depression | 35 (55) | N/A | None | None | 0 | |
| Francesca | July 14 – 19 | Category 1 hurricane | 80 (130) | 973 | None | None | 0 | |
| Gretchen | July 17 – 21 | Category 2 hurricane | 100 (155) | 987 | None | None | 0 | |
| Depression | July 18 – 20 | Tropical depression | 35 (55) | N/A | None | None | 0 | |
| Depression | July 21 – 26 | Tropical depression | 35 (55) | N/A | None | None | 0 | |
| Depression | July 31 – August 11 | Tropical depression | 35 (55) | 1001 | None | None | 0 | |
| Depression | August 5 – 7 | Tropical depression | 35 (55) | N/A | None | None | 0 | |
| Helga | August 10 – 13 | Tropical storm | 45 (75) | 990 | None | None | 0 | |
| Ione | August 20 – 31 | Category 3 hurricane | 115 (185) | 954 | None | None | 0 | |
| Olive | August 22 – 25 | Tropical storm | 45 (75) | 1009 | None | None | 0 | |
| Joyce | August 22 – 27 | Category 1 hurricane | 85 (140) | 973 | None | None | 0 | |
| Kirsten | August 22 – 29 | Category 1 hurricane | 85 (140) | 973 | None | None | 0 | |
| Lorraine | August 23 – 28 | Tropical storm | 50 (85) | 987 | None | None | 0 | |
| Maggie | August 26 – September 1 | Category 4 hurricane | 140 (220) | 928 | None | None | 0 | |
| Depression | September 3 – 7 | Tropical depression | 35 (55) | 1001 | None | None | 0 | |
| Norma | September 9 – 10 | Category 1 hurricane | 75 (120) | 978 | Southwestern Mexico (Guerrero) | N/A | 3 | |
| Orlene | September 22 – 24 | Category 2 hurricane | 105 (165) | 987 | Southwestern Mexico, Western Mexico, Northwest Mexico (Sinaloa) | N/A | 0 | |
| Patricia | October 4 – 15 | Category 1 hurricane | 90 (150) | 964 | None | None | 0 | |
| Depression | October 14 – 15 | Tropical depression | 30 (45) | 1004 | None | None | 0 | |
| Rosalie | October 20 – 24 | Tropical storm | 65 (100) | 987 | None | None | 0 | |
Season aggregates
| 25 systems | May 28 – October 24 | | 140 (220) | 928 | | 4 | 21 – 31 | |

== See also ==
- List of Pacific hurricanes
- Pacific hurricane season
- 1974 Atlantic hurricane season
- 1974 Pacific typhoon season
- 1974 North Indian Ocean cyclone season
- Australian cyclone seasons: 1973–74, 1974–75
- South Pacific cyclone seasons: 1973–74, 1974–75
- South-West Indian Ocean cyclone seasons: 1973–74, 1974–75
