= Tropical Storm Dolores (2021) =

Eastern Pacific tropical storm in 2021

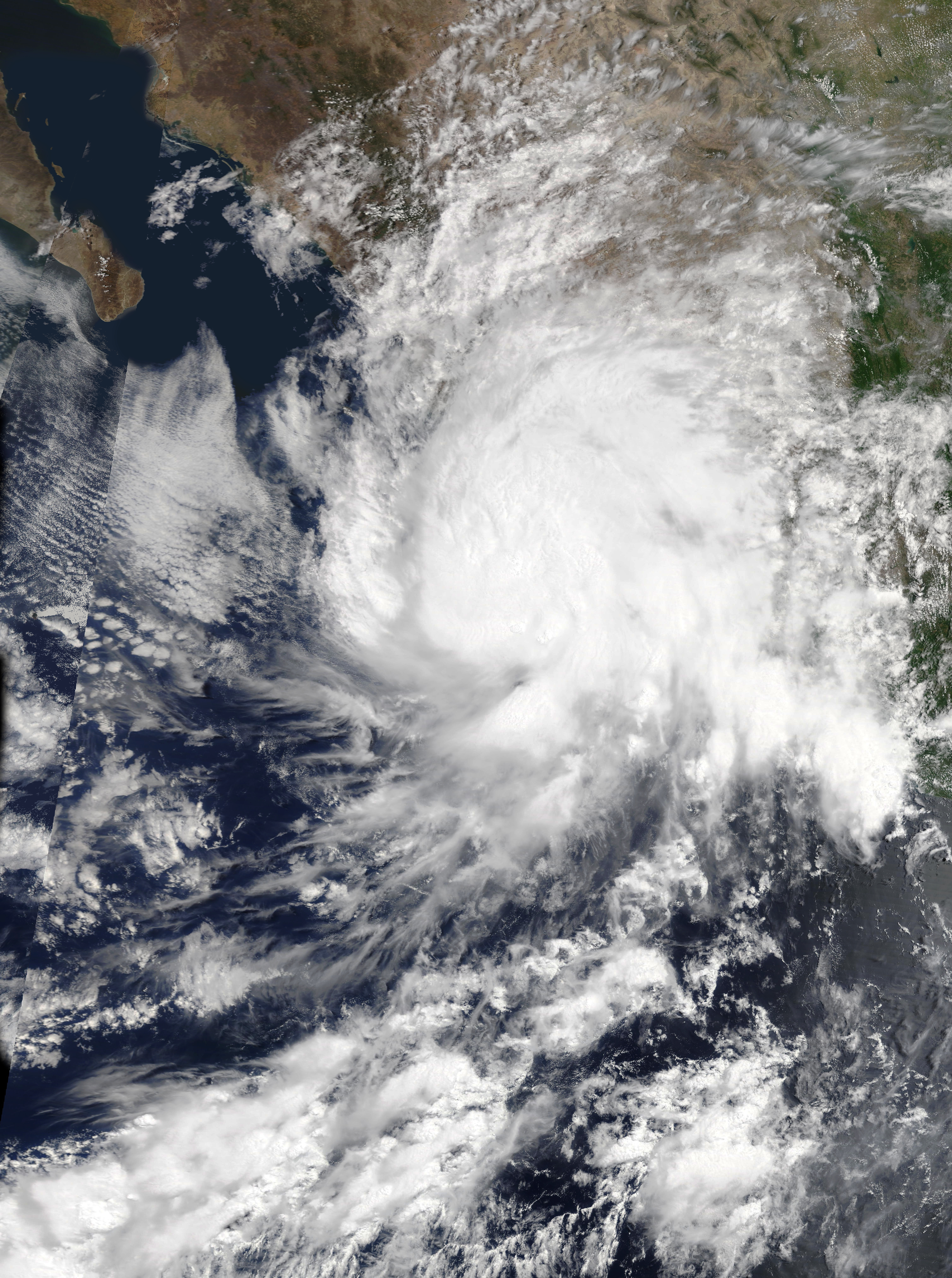
- Tropical Storm Dolores shortly after landfall on June 19, 2021.

Meteorological history
- Formed: June 18, 2021
- Dissipated: June 20, 2021

Tropical storm
- 1-minute sustained (SSHWS/NWS)
- Highest winds: 70 mph (110 km/h)
- Lowest pressure: 989 mbar (hPa); 29.21 inHg

Overall effects
- Fatalities: 3 total
- Damage: $50 million (2021 USD)
- Areas affected: Southwestern Mexico
- IBTrACS /
- Part of the 2021 Pacific hurricane season

Tropical Storm Dolores was a strong tropical storm that made landfall in southwestern Mexico in June 2021. The fourth named storm of the 2021 Pacific hurricane season, Dolores developed from a low-pressure area that formed offshore the Mexican state of Oaxaca on June 16, 2021. The low steadily developed organized deep convection and a closed surface circulation, becoming Tropical Depression Four-E around 06:00 UTC June 18. (Note: All times are in Universal Time Coordinated) The depression strengthened into a tropical storm nine hours later and was named Dolores. Gradually approaching the southwestern coast of Mexico, Dolores steadily intensified despite its close proximity to land. The storm reached its peak intensity around 15:00 UTC June 19 with maximum sustained winds of 115 km/h (70 mph) and a minimum barometric pressure of 29.2 inHg (989 mbar), just below hurricane strength. Shortly after reaching this intensity, Dolores made landfall just northwest of Punta San Telmo, near the Colima–Michoacán state border. The storm rapidly weakened as it moved inland over Mexico and dissipated early on June 20 over the state of Zacatecas.

The precursor disturbance to Dolores and the Atlantic's Tropical Storm Claudette caused several days of heavy rainfall across southern Mexico and Central America. Tropical storm watches and warnings, as well as a hurricane watch, were issued along the southwestern coast of Mexico shortly after Dolores' upgrade to a tropical storm, from Nayarit southeastward to Michoacán. At least three people died in Mexico due to the storm, with two of the deaths occurring in Guerrero and the third in Jalisco. Total damage across Mexico was estimated at USD50 million. (Note: All damage totals are valued as of 2021 and in United States dollars, unless otherwise noted)

== Meteorological history ==
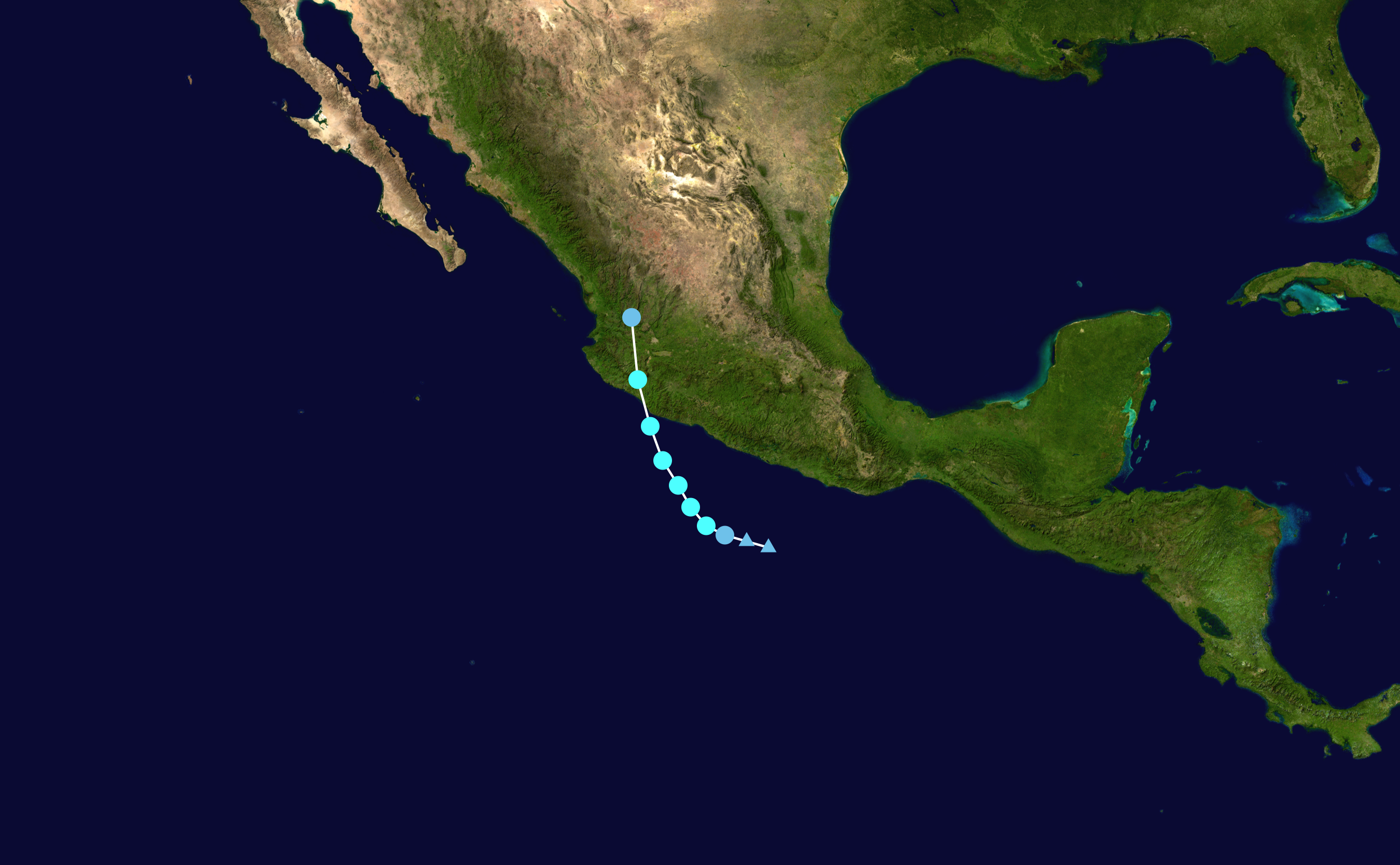
Map plotting the storm's track and intensity, according to the Saffir–Simpson scale Map key Saffir–Simpson scale Tropical depression (≤38 mph, ≤62 km/h) Tropical storm (39–73 mph, 63–118 km/h) Category 1 (74–95 mph, 119–153 km/h) Category 2 (96–110 mph, 154–177 km/h) Category 3 (111–129 mph, 178–208 km/h) Category 4 (130–156 mph, 209–251 km/h) Category 5 (≥157 mph, ≥252 km/h) Unknown Storm type Tropical cyclone Subtropical cyclone Extratropical cyclone, remnant low, tropical disturbance, or monsoon depression

A convectively-enhanced monsoon trough developed over the eastern Pacific Ocean in early June 2021, offshore the western coast of Central America. A separate tropical wave crossing Central America around this time interacted with the trough, resulting in a broad atmospheric circulation forming over the region by June 12. The northern part of this disturbed weather pattern moved north into the Gulf of Mexico, where it eventually developed into a separate tropical cyclone, Tropical Storm Claudette. The southern portion produced a new low-pressure area to the south of Mexico by June 16 over open waters. This new system started to produce a wide area of disorganized showers and thunderstorms. The disturbance organized little until early on June 18, when convection surrounding the system's center became more well-organized. Simultaneously, a closed surface circulation formed, which signaled the development of a tropical depression at 06:00 UTC that day. Expanding deep convection over the center of the depression, as well as increasing Dvorak classifications, resulted in its upgrade to a tropical storm at 15:00 UTC, whereupon it was named Dolores.

A large tropical storm, Dolores gradually intensified due to favorable environmental conditions for the remainder of the day, characterized by warm sea surface temperatures and low wind shear. The cyclone also underwent a general north-northwestward motion as it rounded the western side of mid-level ridge. Deep convection began to develop in more organized, large rainbands over Dolores' circulation around 09:00 UTC on June 19, and increased in coverage near the storm's center. Dolores continued to become more organized as it neared the coastline of southwest Mexico, with a defined eye and an almost-closed eyewall developing. The storm reached peak intensity shortly before 15:00 UTC that day, with maximum 1-minute sustained winds of 115 km/h (70 mph) and a minimum barometric pressure of 29.2 inHg (989 mbar). Dolores made landfall just after reaching peak intensity near the border of the Mexican states of Colima and Michoacán, slightly northwest of the town of Punta San Telmo in the latter state. Dolores rapidly weakened as it moved inland over western Mexico as it interacted with the mountainous terrain in the area. The cyclone was downgraded to a tropical depression at 03:00 UTC on June 20. Shortly afterward, Dolores' surface circulation dissipated over southwestern Zacatecas. However, mid-level moisture associated with Dolores' remnants continued north over west-central Mexico for another 12–24 hours.

== Preparations and impact ==
Tropical Storm Dolores making landfall in Mexico on June 19.

The resort city of Puerto Vallarta opened 20 shelters in advance of Dolores due to expected heavy rainfall of up to 380 millimetres (15 in) and anticipated storm surge. A total of 198 shelters were opened in 35 municipalities across the state of Jalisco prior to Dolores moving through the area. Residents of several states in southwestern Mexico were advised to prepare for tropical-storm-force winds, power outages, landslides, overflowing rivers and widespread punctual rains as Dolores approached.

The precursor to Dolores, in sync with the precursor of Tropical Storm Claudette over the Bay of Campeche, caused days of heavy rainfall across southern Mexico and Central America. Torrential rains lashed the states of Oaxaca, Guerrero, and Michoacán as the cyclone approached. Heavy rainfall from Dolores caused several alligators to leave their natural habitats, with one large caiman appearing on a popular tourist beach in Acapulco. A highway connecting the town of Playa Azul to the city of Zihuatanejo was closed due to the flooding. In neighboring Oaxaca, at least ten communities of the indigenous Zapotec peoples experienced overflowing streams and rivers, as well as damage to agriculture and infrastructure due to the combined effects of Dolores' and Claudette's precursor system. The worst damage in Oaxaca occurred in the Sierra Sur and Costa regions, where debris were strewn across roads and extensive mudslides rendered many streets impassable.

At least 232 fallen trees were reported throughout the state of Colima due to Dolores' strong winds. Over 16 consecutive hours of rain fell across the state from June 18–19. Rainfall accumulation peaked around 439.9 mm (17.31 in) in Callejones, with isolated areas of over 12 inches elsewhere, including 400 mm (15.75 in) near Tecomán. The extreme rainfall resulted in floods that damaged banana crops statewide and threatened other agriculture. More than 150 people rode out the storm at an evacuation center at a school in Cerra de Ortega, Tecomán. At least two houses were seriously damaged by flooding in the state. In neighboring Michoacán, at least 20 municipalities were affected by torrential rainfall for nearly 30 consecutive hours that flooded buildings and uprooted trees. Landslides from the heavy rainfall blocked roads in the municipalities of Lázaro Cárdenas, Uruapan, Aquila, Chinicuila. Apatzingán, Morelia, and Arteaga. An overflowing stream caused flooding in the village of Villa Victoria, Chinicuila.

The Federal Electricity Commission (CFE) reported 54,399 customers lost electricity across Jalisco, Nayarit and Sinaloa due to Dolores' passage to the south and east of those states. Torrential rainfall and flash flooding lashed southern portions of Jalisco. At least 80 houses and 300 people living in El Rebalse were isolated in floodwaters after the Marabasco River overflowed. A man died in a soccer field in Ciudad Guzmán after being struck by lightning. The outer bands of Dolores also caused minor flooding in neighboring Nayarit and further north in Sinaloa.

Insured losses from Dolores across Mexico were estimated at USD50 million by professional services corporation Aon. The Mexican Secretary of National Defense, Luis Cresencio Sandoval, activated Plan DN-III-E following Dolores' landfall, which allowed for the dispatch of 2,302 military units to assist in relief efforts in Colima, Michoacán and Guerrero. Additionally, 190 shelters, 10 shelters, and 8 community kitchens were opened in these states to assist affected residents. The Colima State Civil Protection Unit noted there was only moderate damage to infrastructure in coastal areas statewide following the storm. However, Dolores caused significant damage to Colima's agricultural sector, with 60% of banana crops in the state wiped out by flooding, causing the price of bananas to rise statewide following the cyclone's passage. Despite its destructive effects elsewhere, the heavy rainfall from Dolores and its precursor also benefited parts of Guerrero, which was suffering from drought conditions, thereby helping its agricultural sector.

== See also ==
- Weather of 2021
- Tropical cyclones in 2021
- List of Eastern Pacific tropical storms
- Other storms named Dolores
- Tropical Storm Narda (2019) – tropical storm that also made landfall on southwestern Mexico and affected similar areas
- Tropical Storm Max (2023) – tropical storm that took a similar path and affected similar areas
