= List of storms named Dolores =

The name Dolores (or Delores, a misspelling) has been used for twelve tropical cyclones in the Eastern Pacific Ocean and for one in the Western Pacific.

In the Eastern Pacific:

- Hurricane Dolores (1966) – Category 1 hurricane that stayed out at sea.
- Tropical Depression Dolores (1970) – operationally thought to have reached tropical storm strength.
- Hurricane Dolores (1974) – made landfall in the vicinity of Acapulco.
- Hurricane Dolores (1979) – Category 3 hurricane that stayed out at sea.
- Hurricane Dolores (1985) – Category 3 hurricane that never affected land.
- Hurricane Delores (1991) – did not make landfall.
- Hurricane Dolores (1997) – Category 1 hurricane that never affected land.
- Tropical Storm Dolores (2003) – short-lived storm that never threatened land.
- Tropical Storm Dolores (2009) – short-lived storm.
- Hurricane Dolores (2015) – Category 4 hurricane that brought record-breaking rain to Southern California.
- Tropical Storm Dolores (2021) – made landfall in Southwestern Mexico.

In the Western Pacific:

- Tropical Storm Dolores (1948) (T4813) – Storm that dissipated off the coast of Japan: also named Eunice after Dolores was thought to have dissipated operationally.
