= Hurricane Dolores (1974) =

Category 1 Pacific hurricane in 1974

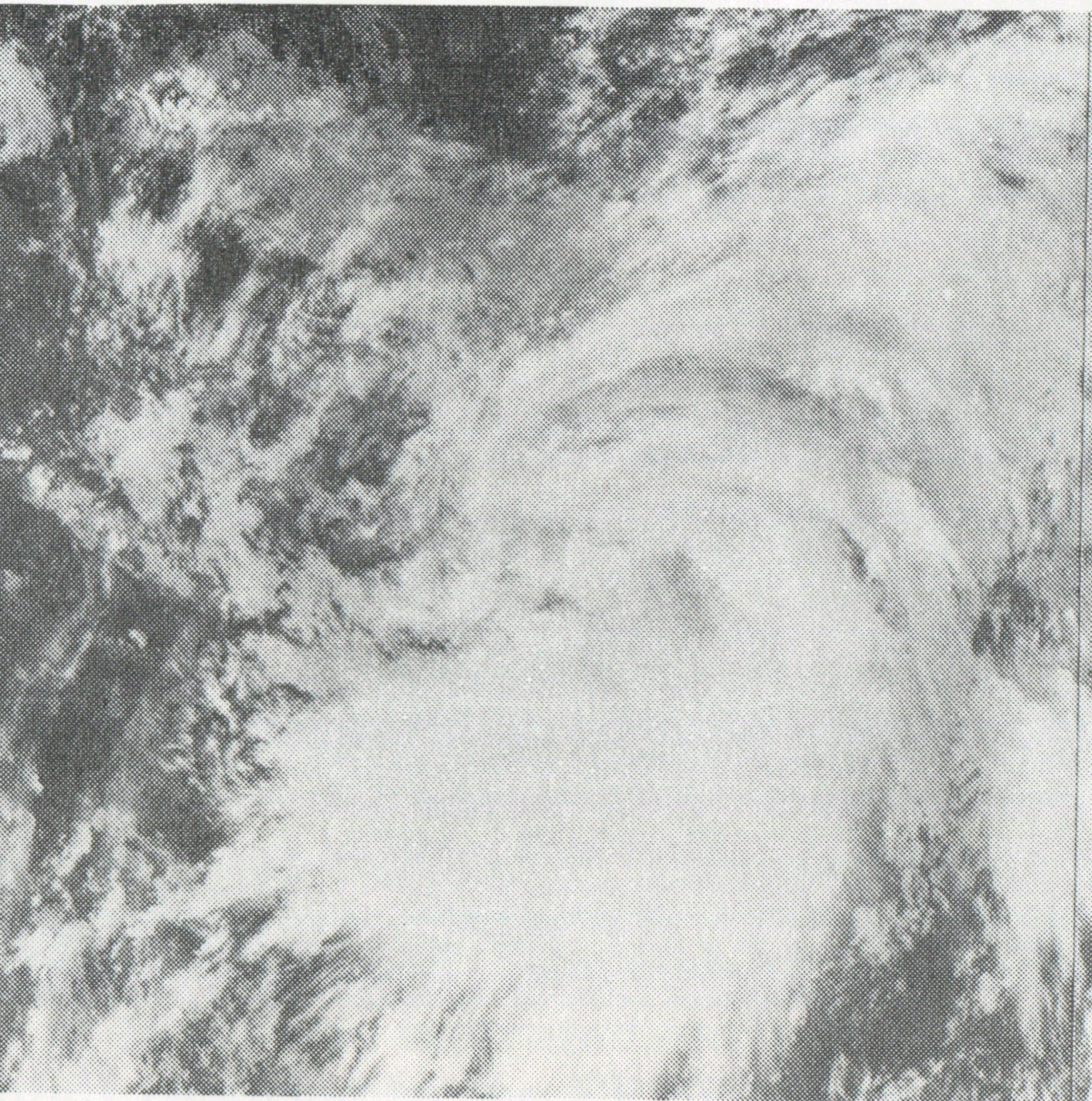
- Satellite image of Dolores on June 17

Meteorological history
- Formed: June 14, 1974
- Dissipated: June 17, 1974

Category 1 hurricane
- 1-minute sustained (SSHWS/NWS)
- Highest winds: 80 mph (130 km/h)
- Lowest pressure: 973 mbar (hPa); 28.73 inHg

Overall effects
- Fatalities: 18–28 total
- Damage: $4 million (1974 USD)
- Areas affected: Southwestern Mexico (especially around Acapulco)
- IBTrACS
- Part of the 1974 Pacific hurricane season

Hurricane Dolores was regarded as the worst hurricane to strike Acapulco since 1938. Developing on June 13, 1974, the system rapidly organized into a tropical storm the next day off the southern coast of Mexico. Over the following day, Dolores developed an eye-like feature and attained hurricane status. With peak winds of 80 mph (130 km/h), the storm made landfall near Acapulco. Once onshore, Dolores rapidly dissipated and was last noted on June 17.

Across Southwestern Mexico, Hurricane Dolores produced heavy rains that triggered widespread flooding and mudslides. Numerous roads sustained damage, separating communities from surrounding areas. At least 18 people were killed and 32 others were injured by the storm. Additionally, an estimated 173,000 people were affected across the country.

== Meteorological history ==
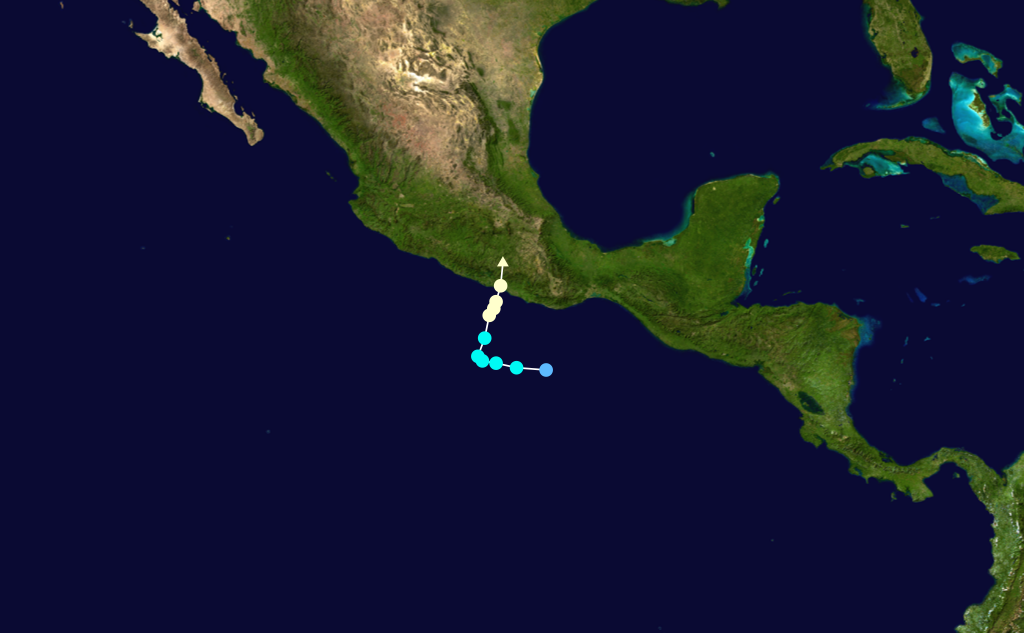
Map plotting the storm's track and intensity, according to the Saffir–Simpson scale Map key Saffir–Simpson scale Tropical depression (≤38 mph, ≤62 km/h) Tropical storm (39–73 mph, 63–118 km/h) Category 1 (74–95 mph, 119–153 km/h) Category 2 (96–110 mph, 154–177 km/h) Category 3 (111–129 mph, 178–208 km/h) Category 4 (130–156 mph, 209–251 km/h) Category 5 (≥157 mph, ≥252 km/h) Unknown Storm type Tropical cyclone Subtropical cyclone Extratropical cyclone, remnant low, tropical disturbance, or monsoon depression

On June 13, 1974, a tropical disturbance was identified several hundred miles south of Mexico. Tracking westward, rapid development ensued the following day and the system was classified a tropical depression around 12 UTC. Shortly thereafter, satellite intensity estimates indicated further strengthening and the storm was upgraded to Tropical Storm Dolores. Development temporarily slowed on June 15 as the structure gradually organized. Enhanced by the Intertropical Convergence Zone, a band of deep convection wrapped into the storm. A banding eye-feature developed later that day, indicating Dolores to be near hurricane strength.

Late on June 15, Dolores' forward motion slowed as it turned almost due north towards the Mexican coastline. Around 00 UTC on June 16, it is estimated that the storm intensified into a hurricane, with sustained winds peaking at 80 mph (130 km/h). Based on satellite imagery, Dolores is also estimated to have attained a barometric pressure of 973 hPa (28.73 inHg). Roughly 18 hours later, Dolores made landfall near Acapulco. Winds in the area were measured up to 77 mph (124 km/h). Once onshore, rapid dissipation ensued and Dolores was last noted early on June 17.

== Impact ==
Regarded as the worst hurricane since 1938, Dolores brought torrential rains and high winds to much of Southwestern Mexico. Along the coast, near where Dolores made landfall, 30 homes were destroyed by winds estimated in excess of 75 mph (120 km/h). Several rivers over-topped their banks, inundating nearby communities. In the low-lying suburbs of Acapulco, nearly 600 people were injured or left homeless. According to the Centro Nacional de Prevención de Desastres (National Center for Prevention of Disasters), 18 people were killed in the states of Guerrero and Oaxaca; media reports indicated a higher toll of 22. Estimated losses from the storm exceeded $4 million. Nine people were killed by landslides in rural mountain communities surrounding Acapulco. The Costa Chica Highway, which runs from Acapulco to Pinotepa, sustained major damage and areas surrounding the roadway were declared disaster areas. Offshore, six people were listed as missing after their trawler, the Peregrine, was caught in the storm. In the storm's wake, the Mexican Army was deployed in Oaxaca to distribute relief supplies, such as food, medicines, and blankets to an estimated 173,000 people affected by the hurricane.

== See also ==
- Other storms of the same name
- 1974 Pacific hurricane season
- Tropical Storm Carlotta (2018)
- Hurricane Agatha (2022)
