= Tropical Storm Carlotta (2018) =

Eastern Pacific tropical storm

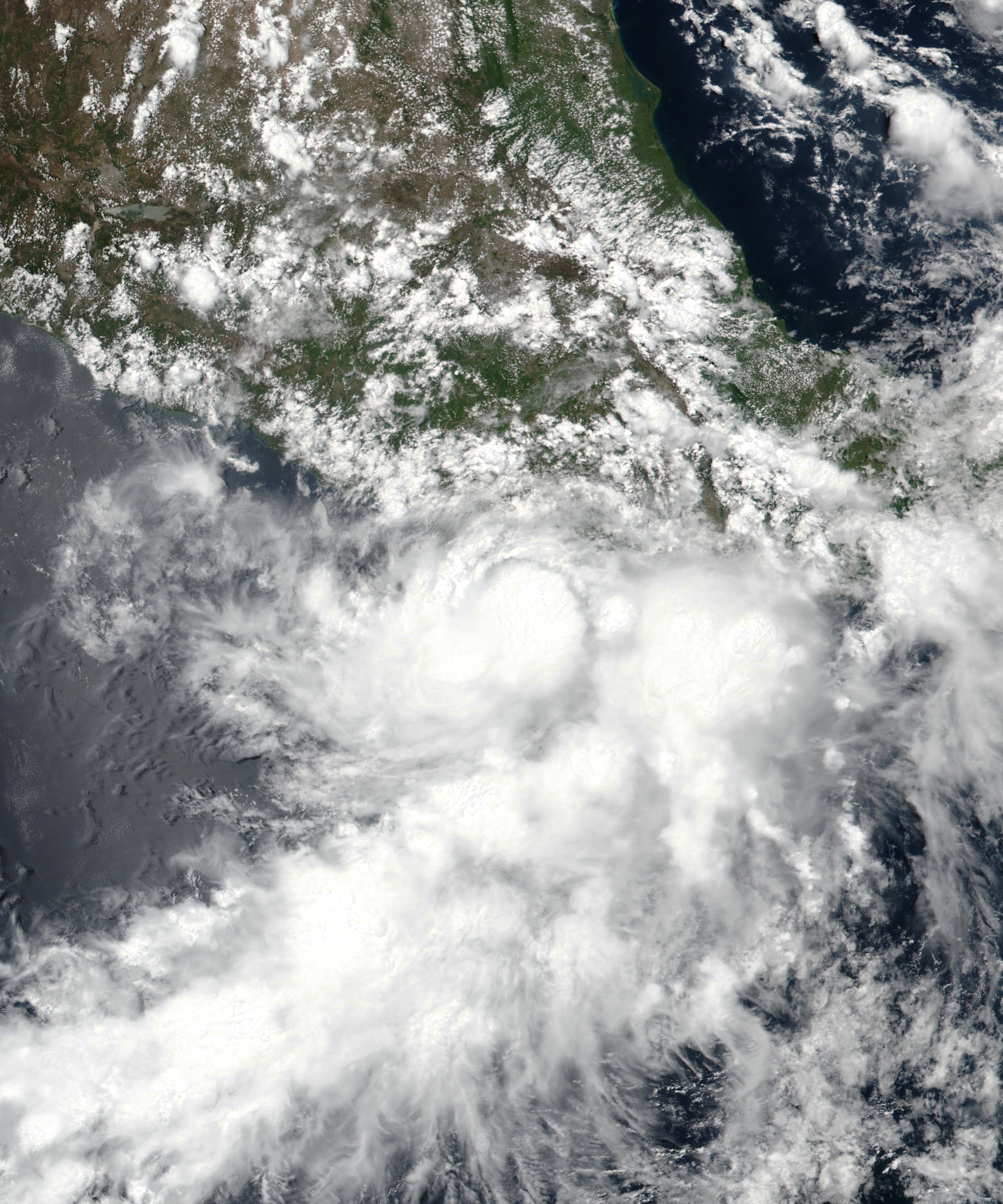
- Tropical Storm Carlotta strengthening off the southwestern coast of Mexico on June 16

Meteorological history
- Formed: June 14, 2018
- Dissipated: June 19, 2018

Tropical storm
- 1-minute sustained (SSHWS/NWS)
- Highest winds: 65 mph (100 km/h)
- Lowest pressure: 997 mbar (hPa); 29.44 inHg

Overall effects
- Fatalities: 3 total
- Damage: >$7.6 million (2018 USD)
- Areas affected: Central and Southern Mexico
- IBTrACS /
- Part of the 2018 Pacific hurricane season

Tropical Storm Carlotta was a moderately strong tropical cyclone that caused flooding in several states in southwestern and central Mexico. Carlotta, the third named storm of the 2018 Pacific hurricane season, formed as the result of a breakdown in the Intertropical Convergence Zone. On June 12, a broad area of low pressure developed several hundred miles south of Mexico and strengthened into a tropical storm by June 15. The next day, the system stalled unexpectedly within a favorable environment, which led to more intensification than originally anticipated. Early on June 17, Carlotta reached peak intensity with maximum sustained winds of 65 mph (100 km/h) and a minimum central pressure of 997 mbar (29.44 inHg) while located only 30 mi (50 km) south-southeast of Acapulco. The system then began to interact with land and experience wind shear, which resulted in the storm weakening to tropical depression status later in the day. The system weakened to a remnant low early on June 19 and dissipated several hours later.

Carlotta prompted the issuance of multiple watches and warnings for the southern coast of Mexico. The storm caused three deaths, two of which were in Aguascalientes and the other in Oaxaca. Flooding and landslides also occurred throughout the states of Aguascalientes, Guerrero, Michoacán, Oaxaca, and Puebla, as well as in the Yucatán Peninsula. Damage from the system was reported to be minor.

== Meteorological history ==
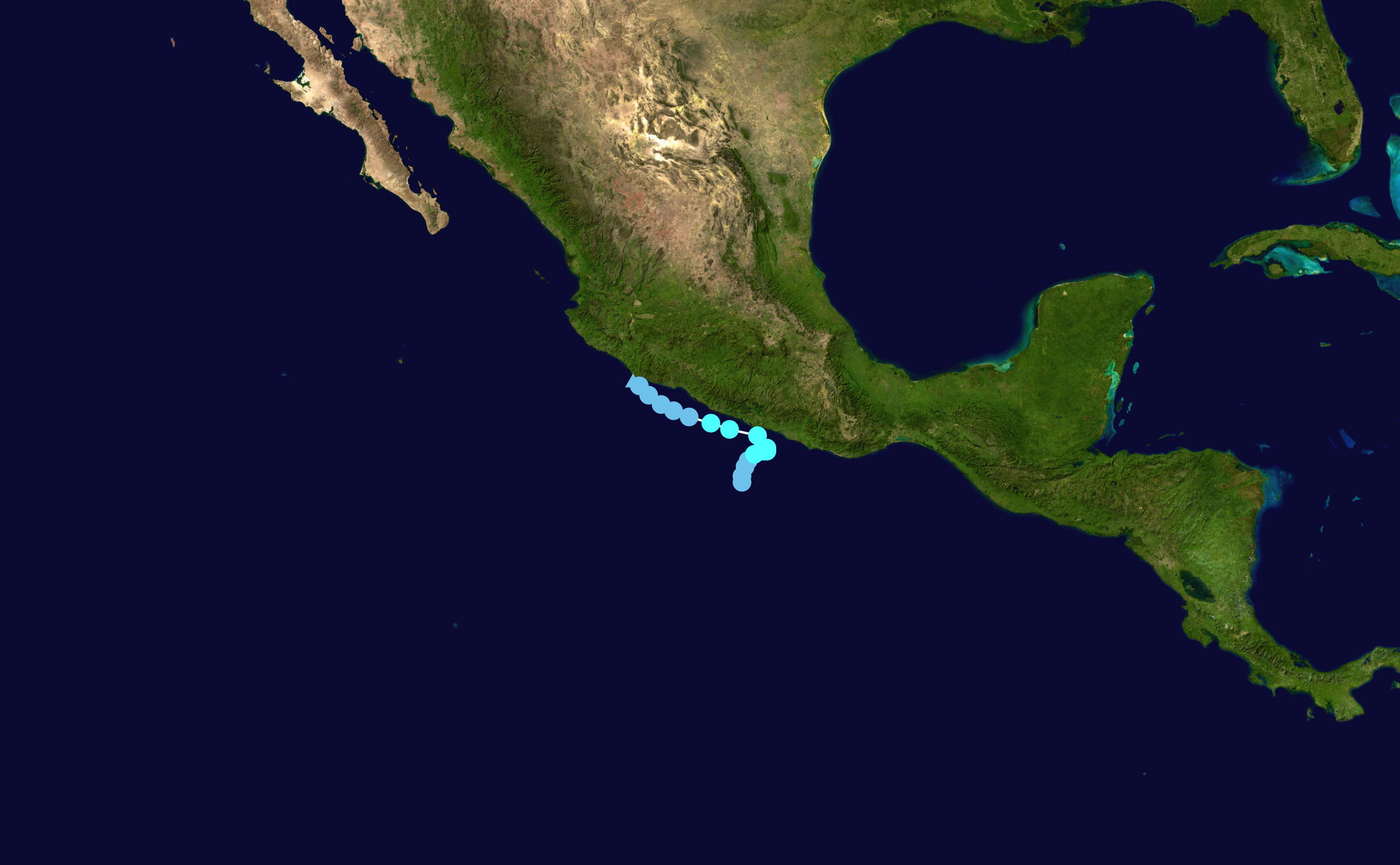
Map plotting the storm's track and intensity, according to the Saffir–Simpson scale Map key Saffir–Simpson scale Tropical depression (≤38 mph, ≤62 km/h) Tropical storm (39–73 mph, 63–118 km/h) Category 1 (74–95 mph, 119–153 km/h) Category 2 (96–110 mph, 154–177 km/h) Category 3 (111–129 mph, 178–208 km/h) Category 4 (130–156 mph, 209–251 km/h) Category 5 (≥157 mph, ≥252 km/h) Unknown Storm type Tropical cyclone Subtropical cyclone Extratropical cyclone, remnant low, tropical disturbance, or monsoon depression

Tropical Storm Carlotta formed as the result of a breakdown in the Intertropical Convergence Zone to the south of Mexico. A tropical wave that traversed Central America around June 11 may have contributed to the storm's formation as well. On June 12, the Miami-based National Hurricane Center (NHC) reported that a broad area of low pressure had formed several hundred miles south of southeastern Mexico. The NHC continued to monitor the disturbance over the next two days as it drifted northward. Initially, strong upper-level winds prevented development, but the system increased in organization unexpectedly on June 14. Following further structural improvements, the NHC upgraded the system to tropical depression status at 18:00 UTC while it was located about 140 mi (220 km) south of Acapulco. Around that time, the NHC forecast that a mid-level ridge over Mexico would weaken the following day, and would leave the depression in an area of light steering currents. Despite being located in a favorable environment with low to moderate wind shear and sea surface temperatures exceeding 86 °F (30 °C), the depression experienced minimal change in intensity over the next 18 hours. After the system's center reformed farther north, the NHC amended its intensity forecast to indicate reduced strengthening, citing the fact that the system would spend less time over water. Around 18:00 UTC on June 15, the system strengthened into a tropical storm, after which it was assigned the name Carlotta. The system's intensity then leveled off for about twelve hours.

Early on June 16, Carlotta's forward motion began to fluctuate, changing from northeast to southeast in six hours. The storm began to intensify again around 06:00 UTC as it stalled off the coast of Mexico. Soon after, the cyclone began moving in a northerly direction. Over the next twelve hours, Carlotta experienced little change in organization before peaking at 00:00 UTC on June 17, with maximum sustained winds of 65 mph (100 km/h) and a minimum central pressure of 997 mbar (29.44 inHg) while located only 30 mi (50 km) south-southeast of Acapulco. Around that time, the NHC noted that the system's structure had improved significantly, with a contracting eye and more symmetric eyewall. As the system started tracking towards the northwest, Carlotta began to weaken because of increasing interaction with land and northerly wind shear. Around 18:00 UTC on the June 17, the storm weakened into a tropical depression after lacking organized deep convection for several hours. Over the next day, the depression continued to weaken before degenerating into a remnant low on June 19 at 00:00 UTC. Shortly afterwards, Carlotta's upper-level circulation decoupled entirely and drifted towards the southwest, while the low- and mid-level remnants remained. The system's remnants dissipated around 06:00 UTC while located offshore of the Mexican coast between Manzanillo and Zihuatanejo, having never made landfall as a tropical cyclone.

== Preparations and impact ==
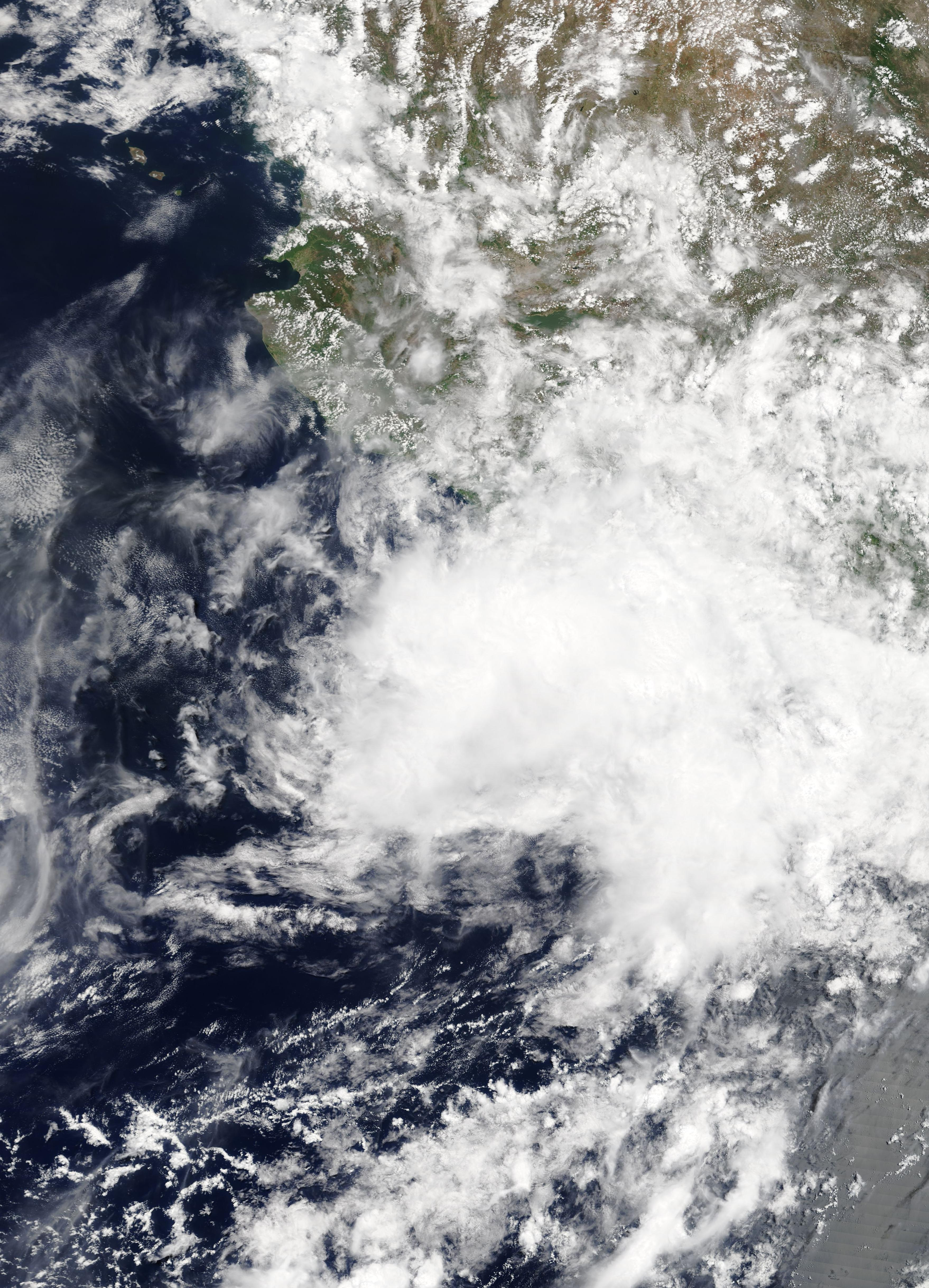
Tropical Depression Carlotta weakening off the southern coast of Mexico on June 18.

On June 14 at 21:00 UTC, the Government of Mexico issued a tropical storm watch for Tecpan de Galeana to Punta Maldonado, which was upgraded to a tropical storm warning six hours later. At 15:00 UTC, the next day, the tropical storm warning was extended to Lagunas de Chacahua. Six hours later, the warning was discontinued for Tecpan de Galeana to west of Acapulco. On June 17 at 03:00 UTC, the warning was extended westward from Acapulco to Tecpan de Galeana and cancelled to the east of Punta Maldonado. At 09:00 UTC, the warning was discontinued east of Tecpan de Galeana and extended westward to Lazaro Cardenas. The tropical storm warning was canceled at 18:00 UTC, after the storm weakened into a tropical depression.

Tropical Storm Carlotta caused flooding in southern Mexico, with the states of Aguascalientes, Guerrero, Michoacán, Oaxaca, and Puebla, being affected, as well as the Yucatán Peninsula. In the Yucatán Peninsula, Carlotta, a tropical wave, and another low-pressure system dropped 70–400 mm (3–20 in) of rain, causing severe flooding. In the Tizimín Municipality, the Popolnáh police station was inundated and the DN-III-E Plan, a plan for the coordination of search and rescue operations and disaster aid, was activated to help with recovery efforts.

In Oaxaca, severe flooding killed one individual. Fishermen recovered the body of a 29-year-old man about 10 mi (20 km) off the coast after he was dragged away by flood waters and drowned. The proximity of the storm prompted the closure of the ports of Huatulco, Puerto Ángel, and Puerto Escondido as well as the suspension of fishing operations. Multiple landslides also occurred as a result of the extreme rainfall. Only minor damage was reported in Guerrero. In the Costa Chica region, the storm damaged several palapas on a beach and the fishing equipment of at least 80 families, preventing them from working. In the municipalities of Tecpan de Galeana, Zihuatanejo and Petatlán, 42 homes were inundated by flood waters. A total of 138 trees were downed in Acapulco and several other municipalities. In Acapulco, a hospital sustained damage to its windows and four injuries were reported. Additionally, 32 neighborhoods lost power, nine houses lost their roofs, and 11 roads collapsed. In Tehuacán, Puebla, homes and businesses were flooded, multiple cars were stranded, and several trees fell. Nearby, a state highway and a bridge collapsed, cutting off several towns in the area.

In Michoacán, multiple cities along the coast experienced severe flooding. In Melchor Ocampo, a peak rainfall total of 285.0 mm (11.2 in) occurred. Approximately 211 mm (8.31 in) of rain fell in La Villita while 195 mm (7.68 in) was recorded in Presa La Villita. Rainfall caused the Acalpican River to overflow its banks. In the Tiquicheo Municipality, 10 houses were flooded after a river near the city overflowed its banks. Multiple homes were inundated in the Zamora Municipality. In Pátzcuaro, multiple landslides occurred, damaging roads in the region. In Nuevo Urecho, the overflow of the Los Hervores River damaged water pumps, resulting in a water shortage throughout the municipality. Throughout the storm, 35 temporary shelters were in operation in Michoacán. The insurance claims statewide reached MX$156 million (US$7.6 million).

In Aguascalientes, Carlotta caused infrastructural damage and two indirect deaths in Aguascalientes City. Rainfall from the system flooded streets, sweeping away dozens of cars and prompting the rescue of several people. Two women became trapped in their vehicle because of rising flood waters and died of carbon monoxide poisoning. After 57 mm (2.2 in) of rain fell, the city's drainage system failed, 12 houses were flooded, and 12 trees fell. A waterspout was reported in the state. Mexican authorities alerted the public that the El Cedazo dam had the potential to overflow because of the heavy rainfall, although this did not occur.

== See also ==
- Weather of 2018
- Tropical cyclones in 2018
- List of Eastern Pacific tropical storms
- Other storms of the same name
- Hurricane Dolores (1974)
- Tropical Storm Beatriz (1993)
- Tropical Storm Cristina (1996)
- Tropical Storm Boris (2014)
