= List of Atlantic tropical storms =

Tropical Storm Hanna on September 29, 2026, the most recent tropical storm-strength system in the Atlantic

The classification Atlantic tropical storm is used to refer to a tropical cyclone that forms in the North Atlantic Ocean with 1-minute maximum sustained wind speeds from 39 mph (63 km/h) to 72 mph (117 km/h). Tropical cyclones that attain such winds and move over land while maintaining those winds are capable of causing minor to moderate damage to human lives and infrastructure. Since the Atlantic hurricane database (HURDAT) began in 1851, there have been 761 tropical storms recorded, (Note: This total does not include subtropical storms.) as well as 92 others not recognized by HURDAT, but recognized by the International Best Track Archive for Climate Stewardship (IBTrACS) as possible tropical storms, in the North Atlantic tropical cyclone basin, which is denoted as the part of the Atlantic Ocean north of the equator. This list does not include tropical storms that later intensified into hurricanes.

The development of tropical storms in the North Atlantic basin is influenced by many factors. During the Northern Hemisphere winter and spring months of December to April, sea surface temperatures in the tropics are usually too low to support tropical cyclogenesis, and there are multiple high-pressure systems, such as the Azores High, that also inhibit tropical cyclogenesis. These effects are reduced or even disappear during hurricane season from May to November, when sea surface temperatures are also high enough to support tropical cyclogenesis; the bulk of recorded tropical storms developed during June to November. Global weather patterns may also influence hurricane development in the North Atlantic. El Niño events result in reduced numbers of powerful hurricanes through stronger wind shear and lower sea surface temperatures within the basin, while La Niña events increase the number of such hurricanes through the opposite.

== Background ==
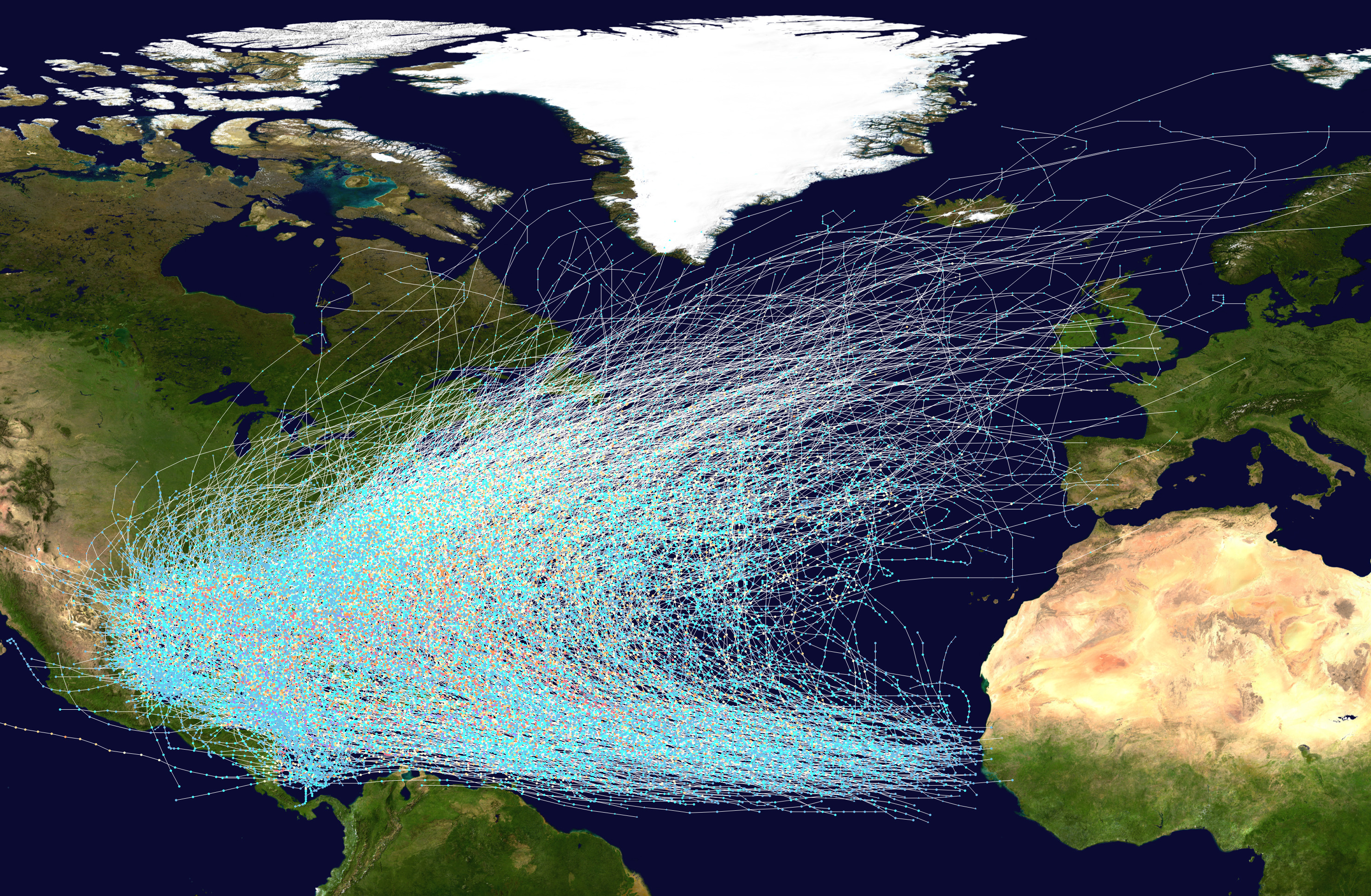
Map of all North Atlantic tropical cyclone tracks from 1851 to 2019. Tropical storms are shown in green.

On the Saffir–Simpson scale, a tropical cyclone reaches tropical storm status when it attains maximum sustained winds of between 34 knots (39 mph; 63 km/h; 17 m/s) and 63 knots (72 mph; 117 km/h; 32 m/s). The National Hurricane Center (NHC) defines sustained winds as the average wind speed measured over the period of one minute at the height of 10 metres (33 ft) above the ground. Should a tropical storm make landfall, its strongest winds are not especially damaging, and are unlikely to cause damage to any sturdy structure, but can often make trees and their branches fall. A larger danger is a tropical storm's rainfall, which can cause major flooding, as in the case of Tropical Storm Allison, and a slow-moving system can cause severe loss of life.

The North Atlantic tropical cyclone basin is defined as the region of the Atlantic Ocean north of the equator, while other boundaries are mainly established by land areas. The main bodies of water included in the Atlantic basin are the North Atlantic Ocean, the Gulf of Mexico, and the Caribbean Sea. Storms that form in the South Atlantic Ocean or in the Mediterranean Sea are not part of the Atlantic basin. The Regional Specialized Meteorological Center (RSMC) for the North Atlantic basin is the NHC, which manages the warnings of tropical cyclones there. On average from 1980 to 2024, an average of 13.6 storms of at least tropical storm strength form in one year, though the number can range from only four in 1983 to thirty in 2020. Of these storms, 6.9 reach hurricane intensity; meaning that 6.7 peak as tropical storms. All tropical cyclones recorded by past and present RSMCs of the North Atlantic basin since 1851 are listed in the North Atlantic hurricane database (HURDAT), which is compiled and maintained by the National Hurricane Center.

== Climatology ==
Tropical storms by month
Month	Number of storms
January	1
February	1
March	0
April	2
May	24
June	80
July	65
August	151
September	222
October	158
November	50
December	7

Tropical storms by decade
Decade	Number of storms
1850s	14
1860s	22
1870s	20
1880s	26
1890s	32
1900s	42
1910s	24
1920s	30
1930s	63
1940s	51
1950s	60
1960s	50
1970s	35
1980s	38
1990s	44
2000s	71
2010s	79
2020s	60

Tropical Storm Ana, the earliest storm ever to make landfall in the United States, did so on May 10, 2015.

Hurricane season in the Atlantic Ocean, during which 97% of storms form, begins on June 1 and ends on November 30. Those that form outside of this time period are known as off-season storms. Since 1851, a total of 761 tropical storms have developed in the North Atlantic Ocean. 35 have occurred in the off-season, 80 in June, 65 in July, 151 in August, 222 in September, 158 in October, and 50 in November.

The formation and development of tropical cyclones, termed tropical cyclogenesis, requires high sea surface temperatures of at least 26.5 °C (79.7 °F) at least as deep as 50 m (160 ft), a sharp temperature difference between the lower and upper atmospheres, moist air and low vertical wind shear. When these conditions are met, a pre-existing tropical disturbance – usually a tropical wave – can develop into a tropical cyclone, provided the disturbance is far enough – at least 500 km (310 mi) – from the Equator to experience a sufficiently strong Coriolis force to exhibit the counterclockwise rotation and low pressure of tropical cyclones in the Northern Hemisphere. Although most storms are found within tropical latitudes, occasionally storms will form further north and east from disturbances other than tropical waves such as cold fronts and upper-level lows. These are known as baroclinically induced tropical cyclones.

Sea surface temperature is more constant than land temperature due to the higher heat capacity of water; thus, it takes longer for the ocean to warm up in the summer than it does the land. On average, the first Atlantic tropical storm of the year usually forms in mid-to-late June. Tropical activity is significantly lower in July and early August, despite higher sea surface temperatures, due to the Saharan air layer – dust from the Sahara desert that blows west each summer – suppressing tropical cyclogenesis. In the summer, the subtropical ridge, which is not conducive to tropical cyclogenesis, moves northward, expanding the area for storms to form. The hurricane season peaks in mid-September, with the two-month period between mid-August and mid-October seeing most activity.

Within tropical latitudes, prevailing winds generally cause Atlantic tropical cyclones move west, though the presence of strong middle and upper-level winds can induce northward or northwestward movement instead. Influenced by the subtropical ridge, the general direction of storms upon reaching the mid-latitudes is northeast, causing them to curve back to sea and away from land.

There is a strong correlation between Atlantic hurricane activity in the tropics and the presence of an El Niño or La Niña in the Pacific Ocean. El Niño sees a warming of the tropical Pacific, while La Niña exhibits cooling in that area: both have far-reaching effects around the world. El Niño events increase the wind shear, especially westerlies, over the Atlantic, producing a less favorable environment for formation and decreasing tropical activity in the Atlantic basin. Conversely, La Niña causes an increase in activity due to a decrease in wind shear.

Tropical storms can take a variety of different tracks across the Atlantic Ocean. As they are weaker, they do not require as high a sea surface temperature, and they are more likely to form in unusual areas, such as Tropical Storm Grace, the northernmost-forming tropical cyclone in the Atlantic; Tropical Storm Christine, the easternmost-forming tropical cyclone in the Atlantic; or Tropical Storm Delta, which hit Morocco as an extratropical cyclone, the first storm ever to do so.

== Systems ==
- List of Atlantic tropical storms (before 1950)
- List of Atlantic tropical storms (1950–1999)
- List of Atlantic tropical storms (2000–present)

== See also ==
- List of Eastern Pacific tropical storms
- List of Western Pacific tropical storms
