= List of Atlantic tropical storms (1950–1999) =

This is a list of Atlantic tropical storms between 1950 and 1999.

== 1950s ==
Regular naming of Atlantic storms began in 1950.

Name	Duration	Peak intensity		Areas affected	Damage (USD)	Deaths	Refs
Name	Duration	Wind speed	Pressure	Areas affected	Damage (USD)	Deaths	Refs
How	October 1 – 4, 1950	45 mph (75 km/h)	Not specified	Texas, Mexico	None	None	
Twelve	October 17 – 24, 1950	70 mph (110 km/h)	Not specified	None	None	None	
Mike	October 25 – 28, 1950	45 mph (75 km/h)	Not specified	None	None	None	
Fifteen	October 27 – 29, 1950	50 mph (85 km/h)	Not specified	None	None	None	
Sixteen	November 10 – 12, 1950	70 mph (110 km/h)	Not specified	None	None	None	
One	January 4 – 9, 1951	65 mph (100 km/h)	Not specified	None	None	None	
Baker	August 2 – 5, 1951	60 mph (95 km/h)	996 hPa (29.41 inHg)	None	None	None	
George	September 19 – 22, 1951	60 mph (95 km/h)	999 hPa (29.50 inHg)	Mexico	None	None	
Item	October 12 – 17, 1951	65 mph (100 km/h)	998 hPa (29.47 inHg)	Cuba	None	None	
One	February 3 – 4, 1952	70 mph (110 km/h)	Not specified	Mexico, Cuba, United States East Coast	Minimal	None	
Three	August 27 – 28, 1952	50 mph (85 km/h)	1000 hPa (29.53 inHg)	The Carolinas	Unknown	None	
Five	September 8 – 11, 1952	50 mph (85 km/h)	Not specified	Azores, Iberian Peninsula	Unknown	None	
Dog	September 24 – 30, 1952	70 mph (110 km/h)	998 hPa (29.47 inHg)	None	None	None	
Eight	September 25 – 30, 1952	45 mph (75 km/h)	Not specified	Cape Verde	None	None	
Eleven	November 26 – 30, 1952	60 mph (95 km/h)	992 hPa (29.29 inHg)	None	None	None	
Alice	May 25 – June 7, 1953	70 mph (110 km/h)	994 hPa (29.35 inHg)	Central America, Cuba, Florida, Alabama	Minimal	None	
Two	July 11 – 15, 1953	50 mph (85 km/h)	Not specified	Florida	None	None	
Five	August 29 – September 1, 1953	40 mph (65 km/h)	1007 hPa (29.74 inHg)	Florida, Georgia	None	None	
Eight	September 15 – 21, 1953	50 mph (85 km/h)	1004 hPa (29.65 inHg)	Florida	Minor	None	
Eleven	October 3 – 6, 1953	65 mph (100 km/h)	Not specified	Cuba, Bahamas, Atlantic Canada	Minor	2	
Thirteen	November 23 – 26, 1953	50 mph (85 km/h)	999 hPa (29.50 inHg)	None	None	None	
Fourteen	December 7 – 9, 1953	65 mph (100 km/h)	Not specified	None	None	None	(Note: HURDAT does not give the system a name, calling it simply AL14. IBTRACS echoes this. However, the reanalysis project gives the storm the name Irene, though its records of the storm call it "Not Named". This article uses Fourteen.)
One	May 28 – 30, 1954	50 mph (85 km/h)	1005 hPa (29.68 inHg)	None	None	None	
Two	June 18 – 25, 1954	70 mph (110 km/h)	Not specified	Florida, Nova Scotia	None	None	
Four	July 10 – 14, 1954	50 mph (85 km/h)	Not specified	None	None	None	
Barbara	July 27 – 30, 1954	60 mph (95 km/h)	999 hPa (29.50 inHg)	Louisiana, Texas	None	None	
Nine	September 6 – 7, 1954	45 mph (75 km/h)	1004 hPa (29.65 inHg)	None	None	None	
Florence	September 10 – 12, 1954	65 mph (100 km/h)	1001 hPa (29.56 inHg)	Mexico	$1.5 million	5	
Eleven	September 15 – 18, 1954	45 mph (75 km/h)	1004 hPa (29.65 inHg)	None	None	None	
Gilda	September 24 – 30, 1954	70 mph (110 km/h)	998 hPa (29.47 inHg)	Honduras, Belize, Mexico	Unknown	29	
Fifteen	November 16 – 21, 1954	40 mph (65 km/h)	1005 hPa (29.68 inHg)	None	None	None	
Brenda	July 31 – August 3, 1955	70 mph (110 km/h)	Not specified	Louisiana	Unknown	2	
Five	August 25 – 28, 1955	50 mph (85 km/h)	1004 hPa (29.65 inHg)	Louisiana	Minor	None	
Eleven	September 23 – 28, 1955	50 mph (85 km/h)	Not specified	None	None	None	
Twelve	October 10 – 14, 1955	65 mph (100 km/h)	Not specified	None	None	None	
One	June 7 – 10, 1956	45 mph (75 km/h)	1002 hPa (29.59 inHg)	None	None	None	
Two	June 12 – 15, 1956	60 mph (95 km/h)	1001 hPa (29.56 inHg)	Louisiana, Mississippi	$50,000	4	
Carla	September 7 – 10, 1956	60 mph (95 km/h)	1000 hPa (29.53 inHg)	None	None	None	
Dora	September 10 – 13, 1956	60 mph (95 km/h)	1000 hPa (29.53 inHg)	Mexico	Minor	27	
Ethel	September 11 – 14, 1956	60 mph (95 km/h)	999 hPa (29.50 inHg)	The Bahamas	None	None	
Nine	October 9 – 12, 1956	45 mph (75 km/h)	Not specified	None	None	None	
Ten	October 14 – 17, 1956	65 mph (100 km/h)	996 hPa (29.41 inHg)	Florida, Outer Banks	$3 million	2	
Twelve	November 19 – 21, 1956	45 mph (75 km/h)	Not specified	None	None	None	
One	June 8 – 10, 1957	65 mph (100 km/h)	1000 hPa (29.53 inHg)	Florida, Georgia	$52,000	5	
Bertha	August 8 – 11, 1957	65 mph (100 km/h)	998 hPa (29.47 inHg)	Louisiana, Texas, Arkansas	$925,000	2	
Debbie	September 7 – 9, 1957	40 mph (65 km/h)	1003 hPa (29.62 inHg)	Florida	Minor	4	
Esther	September 16 – 19, 1957	65 mph (100 km/h)	1000 hPa (29.53 inHg)	Louisiana	$2.5 million	3	
Eight	October 23 – 27, 1957	60 mph (95 km/h)	991 hPa (29.26 inHg)	None	None	None	
One	May 25 – 27, 1958	65 mph (100 km/h)	1001 hPa (29.56 inHg)	Florida, Nova Scotia	None	None	
Alma	June 14 – 16, 1958	65 mph (100 km/h)	Not specified	Mexico, Texas	Unknown	3	
Becky	August 8 – 17, 1958	70 mph (110 km/h)	1004 hPa (29.65 inHg)	Cape Verde	None	None	
Gerda	September 14 – 22, 1958	60 mph (95 km/h)	1001 hPa (29.56 inHg)	Puerto Rico, Hispaniola, Mexico, Texas	Unknown	3	
Twelve	October 15 – 17, 1958	70 mph (110 km/h)	Not specified	None	None	None	
Arlene	May 28 – June 2, 1959	65 mph (100 km/h)	993 hPa (29.32 inHg)	Southeastern United States	$500,000	1	
Beulah	June 15 – 19, 1959	70 mph (110 km/h)	985 hPa (29.09 inHg)	Mexico	None	None	
Six	August 2 – 3, 1959	70 mph (110 km/h)	Not specified	Outer Banks	None	None	
Edith	August 18 – 19, 1959	60 mph (95 km/h)	1007 hPa (29.74 inHg)	Lesser Antilles	None	None	
Eight	August 29 – September 4, 1959	70 mph (110 km/h)	Not specified	None	None	None	
Nine	September 9 – 11, 1959	65 mph (100 km/h)	1002 hPa (29.59 inHg)	None	None	None	
Irene	October 6 – 9, 1959	45 mph (75 km/h)	1000 hPa (29.53 inHg)	Florida, Alabama, Georgia	Unknown	None	

== 1960s ==
Name	Duration	Peak intensity		Areas affected	Damage (USD)	Deaths	Refs
Name	Duration	Wind speed	Pressure	Areas affected	Damage (USD)	Deaths	Refs
One	June 22–28, 1960	60 mph (95 km/h)	1000 hPa (29.53 inHg)	Mexico, Texas, Oklahoma, Arkansas, Missouri, Illinois	$3.6 million	18	
Brenda	July 27–31, 1960	70 mph (110 km/h)	991 hPa (29.26 inHg)	Florida, United States East Coast, Eastern Canada	$5 million	1	
Six	September 1–3, 1960	45 mph (75 km/h)	Not specified	None	None	None	
Florence	September 17–26, 1960	60 mph (95 km/h)	1000 hPa (29.53 inHg)	Greater Antilles, The Bahamas, United States Gulf Coast	Minimal	None	
Six	September 12–15, 1961	70 mph (110 km/h)	995 hPa (29.38 inHg)	The Bahamas, United States East Coast, Atlantic Canada	Minimal	None	
Gerda	October 17–20, 1961	70 mph (110 km/h)	988 hPa (29.18 inHg)	Jamaica, Cuba, The Bahamas, New England	Unknown	7	
Inga	November 4–8, 1961	70 mph (110 km/h)	997 hPa (29.44 inHg)	Mexico	None	None	
Twelve	November 17–21, 1961	60 mph (95 km/h)	1004 hPa (29.65 inHg)	None	None	None	
One	June 30 – July 2, 1962	65 mph (100 km/h)	998 hPa (29.47 inHg)	North Carolina	None	None	
Becky	August 27–31, 1962	60 mph (95 km/h)	Not specified	Cape Verde, Azores	None	None	
Celia	September 12–21, 1962	70 mph (110 km/h)	995 hPa (29.38 inHg)	None	None	None	
One	June 1–4, 1963	60 mph (95 km/h)	1000 hPa (29.53 inHg)	The Bahamas, North Carolina, Mid-Atlantic states	Unknown	None	
Cindy	September 16–20, 1963	65 mph (100 km/h)	996 hPa (29.41 inHg)	Louisiana, Texas	$12.5 million	3	
Helena	October 25–30, 1963	50 mph (85 km/h)	1002 hPa (29.59 inHg)	Lesser Antilles	$500 thousand	5	
One	June 3–11, 1964	70 mph (110 km/h)	992 hPa (29.29 inHg)	Yucatán Peninsula, Cuba, Southeastern United States	$1 million	None	
Two	July 23–26, 1964	60 mph (95 km/h)	1003 hPa (29.62 inHg)	Atlantic Canada	Unknown	None	
Abby	August 5–8, 1964	70 mph (110 km/h)	1000 hPa (29.53 inHg)	United States Gulf Coast	$750 thousand	None	
Brenda	August 8–10, 1964	50 mph (85 km/h)	1006 hPa (29.71 inHg)	Bermuda	$275 thousand	None	
Florence	September 5–10, 1964	45 mph (75 km/h)	1003 hPa (29.62 inHg)	Cape Verde	None	None	
Thirteen	November 5–10, 1964	70 mph (110 km/h)	997 hPa (29.44 inHg)	Central America	$5 million	None	
One	June 13–15, 1965	60 mph (95 km/h)	1005 hPa (29.68 inHg)	Southeastern United States	Minimal	None	
Four	September 7–9, 1965	60 mph (95 km/h)	991 hPa (29.26 inHg)	None	None	None	
Debbie	September 24–30, 1965	60 mph (95 km/h)	1000 hPa (29.53 inHg)	Mexico, United States Gulf Coast	$25 million	None	
Seven	October 2–3, 1965	60 mph (95 km/h)	993 hPa (29.32 inHg)	None	None	None	
Nine	October 16–19, 1965	65 mph (100 km/h)	1004 hPa (29.65 inHg)	The Bahamas, Florida	$4.5 million	None	
Ten	November 29 – December 2, 1965	50 mph (85 km/h)	997 hPa (29.44 inHg)	None	None	None	
Two	June 28 – July 2, 1966	45 mph (75 km/h)	1004 hPa (29.65 inHg)	Cuba, Florida	$50 thousand	None	
Ella	July 22–28, 1966	40 mph (65 km/h)	1008 hPa (29.77 inHg)	None	None	None	
Greta	September 1–6, 1966	50 mph (85 km/h)	1004 hPa (29.65 inHg)	Lesser Antilles	Minor	None	
Hallie	September 20–21, 1966	60 mph (95 km/h)	997 hPa (29.44 inHg)	Mexico	None	None	
Judith	September 27–30, 1966	45 mph (75 km/h)	1007 hPa (29.74 inHg)	Lesser Antilles	None	None	
Kendra	October 3–9, 1966	40 mph (65 km/h)	Not specified	Cape Verde	None	None	
Fourteen	November 13–17, 1966	65 mph (100 km/h)	994 hPa (29.35 inHg)	Iceland	None	None	
Fifteen	November 22–26, 1966	65 mph (100 km/h)	997 hPa (29.44 inHg)	None	None	None	
One	June 15–19, 1967	40 mph (65 km/h)	1006 hPa (29.71 inHg)	The Carolinas	$15 thousand	None	
Two	June 20–23, 1967	50 mph (85 km/h)	1006 hPa (29.71 inHg)	None	None	None	
Four	September 1–5, 1967	40 mph (65 km/h)	1004 hPa (29.65 inHg)	None	None	None	
Eight	September 25 – October 1, 1967	45 mph (75 km/h)	1004 hPa (29.65 inHg)	None	None	None	
Edith	September 26 – October 1, 1967	50 mph (85 km/h)	1000 hPa (29.53 inHg)	Lesser Antilles	Minimal	None	
Ginger	October 5–8, 1967	50 mph (85 km/h)	1011 hPa (29.85 inHg)	Senegal, Cape Verde	None	None	
Twelve	October 14–18, 1967	60 mph (95 km/h)	1002 hPa (29.59 inHg)	Atlantic Canada	None	None	
Candy	June 22–25, 1968	70 mph (110 km/h)	995 hPa (29.38 inHg)	Texas, Arkansas, Louisiana, Midwestern states	$2.7 million	None	
Five	September 10–11, 1968	65 mph (100 km/h)	997 hPa (29.44 inHg)	United States East Coast, Atlantic Canada	None	None	
Edna	September 13–17, 1968	70 mph (110 km/h)	1012 hPa (29.88 inHg)	None	None	None	
Frances	September 23–29, 1968	60 mph (95 km/h)	1001 hPa (29.56 inHg)	None	None	None	
Anna	July 25 – August 4, 1969	70 mph (110 km/h)	1001 hPa (29.56 inHg)	Lesser Antilles	None	None	
Eve	August 24–27, 1969	60 mph (95 km/h)	996 hPa (29.41 inHg)	None	None	None	
Eleven	September 25–30, 1969	70 mph (110 km/h)	1004 hPa (29.65 inHg)	None	None	None	
Jenny	October 1–5, 1969	45 mph (75 km/h)	1000 hPa (29.53 inHg)	Cuba, Florida	None	None	
Sixteen	October 28–31, 1969	70 mph (110 km/h)	990 hPa (29.23 inHg)	None	None	None	

== 1970s ==
Name	Duration	Peak intensity		Areas affected	Damage (USD)	Deaths	Refs
Name	Duration	Wind speed	Pressure	Areas affected	Damage (USD)	Deaths	Refs
Becky	July 19 – 23, 1970	65 mph (100 km/h)	1003 hPa (29.62 inHg)	Southeastern United States	$500,000	None	
Dorothy	August 18 – 22, 1970	70 mph (110 km/h)	996 hPa (29.41 inHg)	Lesser Antilles	$34 million	51	
Six	September 3 – 13, 1970	45 mph (75 km/h)	1006 hPa (29.71 inHg)	None	None	None	
Felice	September 12–18, 1970	70 mph (110 km/h)	990 hPa (29.23 inHg)	Florida, Louisiana, Texas	Minimal	None	
Nine	September 19–23, 1970	45 mph (75 km/h)	Not specified	None	None	None	
Greta	September 26 – October 4, 1970	45 mph (75 km/h)	1003 hPa (29.62 inHg)	Florida, Mexico	Unknown	None	
Fourteen	November 28 – December 1, 1970	65 mph (100 km/h)	987 hPa (29.15 inHg)	None	None	None	
Arlene	July 4–7, 1971	65 mph (100 km/h)	1000 hPa (29.53 inHg)	The Carolinas, Newfoundland	Minimal	None	
Chloe	August 18–25, 1971	65 mph (100 km/h)	1004 hPa (29.65 inHg)	Lesser Antilles, Belize	Minimal	None	
Doria	August 20–28, 1971	65 mph (100 km/h)	989 hPa (29.21 inHg)	United States East Coast, Canada	$148 million	7	
Heidi	September 11–15, 1971	65 mph (100 km/h)	996 hPa (29.41 inHg)	Northeastern United States	Minimal	None	
Janice	September 21–24, 1971	65 mph (100 km/h)	1005 hPa (29.68 inHg)	Leeward Islands	None	None	
Kristy	October 18–21, 1971	50 mph (85 km/h)	992 hPa (29.29 inHg)	None	None	None	
Laura	November 12–22, 1971	70 mph (110 km/h)	994 hPa (29.35 inHg)	Cayman Islands, Cuba, Central America	Minimal	1	
Carrie	August 29 – September 3, 1972	70 mph (110 km/h)	991 hPa (29.26 inHg)	Northeastern United States	$1.78 million	4	
Christine	August 25 – September 4, 1973	70 mph (110 km/h)	996 hPa (29.41 inHg)	Leeward Islands, Puerto Rico	Minor	1	
Delia	September 1 – 7, 1973	70 mph (110 km/h)	986 hPa (29.12 inHg)	Texas, Mexico	$6 million	5	
Gilda	October 16–27, 1973	70 mph (110 km/h)	984 hPa (29.06 inHg)	Cuba, The Bahamas, Atlantic Canada	Unknown	6	
Alma	August 12–15, 1974	65 mph (100 km/h)	1007 hPa (29.74 inHg)	Trinidad and Tobago, Venezuela	$5 million	51	
Dolly	September 2–5, 1974	50 mph (85 km/h)	1005 hPa (29.68 inHg)	None	None	None	
Elaine	September 4–13, 1974	70 mph (110 km/h)	1001 hPa (29.56 inHg)	None	None	None	
Amy	June 27 – July 4, 1975	70 mph (110 km/h)	981 hPa (28.97 inHg)	United States East Coast	Minimal	1	
Hallie	October 24–27, 1975	50 mph (85 km/h)	1002 hPa (29.59 inHg)	United States East Coast	Minimal	None	
Anna	July 28 – August 1, 1976	45 mph (75 km/h)	999 hPa (29.50 inHg)	Azores	None	None	
Dottie	August 18–21, 1976	50 mph (85 km/h)	996 hPa (29.41 inHg)	The Bahamas, Southeastern United States	Minor	4	
Frieda	October 16–19, 1977	60 mph (95 km/h)	1005 hPa (29.68 inHg)	Cayman Islands, Belize	None	None	
Amelia	July 30 – August 1, 1978	50 mph (85 km/h)	1005 hPa (29.68 inHg)	Texas	$110 million	33	
Bess	August 5–8, 1978	50 mph (85 km/h)	1005 hPa (29.68 inHg)	Mexico	None	None	
Debra	August 26–29, 1978	60 mph (95 km/h)	1000 hPa (29.53 inHg)	Southeastern United States	Minimal	2	
Hope	September 12–21, 1978	65 mph (100 km/h)	987 hPa (29.15 inHg)	None	None	None	
Irma	October 2–5, 1978	50 mph (85 km/h)	1001 hPa (29.56 inHg)	Azores	None	None	
Juliet	October 7 – 11, 1978	50 mph (85 km/h)	1001 hPa (29.56 inHg)	Puerto Rico, Bermuda	None	None	
Ana	June 19–24, 1979	60 mph (95 km/h)	1005 hPa (29.68 inHg)	Lesser Antilles	None	None	
Claudette	July 15–29, 1979	50 mph (85 km/h)	997 hPa (29.44 inHg)	Greater Antilles, West South Central states	$400 million	2	
Elena	August 30 – September 2, 1979	40 mph (65 km/h)	1004 hPa (29.65 inHg)	Texas	$10 million	5	

== 1980s ==
Name	Duration	Peak intensity		Areas affected	Damage (USD)	Deaths	Refs
Name	Duration	Wind speed	Pressure	Areas affected	Damage (USD)	Deaths	Refs
Danielle	September 4–7, 1980	60 mph (95 km/h)	1004 hPa (29.65 inHg)	Texas	$277,500	2	
Hermine	September 20–26, 1980	70 mph (110 km/h)	993 hPa (29.32 inHg)	Central America, Mexico	Unknown	38	
Arlene	May 6–9, 1981	60 mph (95 km/h)	999 hPa (29.50 inHg)	Greater Antilles, The Bahamas	Minimal	None	
Bret	June 29 – July 1, 1981	70 mph (110 km/h)	996 hPa (29.41 inHg)	Virginia, North Carolina	Minimal	1	
Cindy	August 2–5, 1981	60 mph (95 km/h)	1002 hPa (29.59 inHg)	None	None	None	
Jose	October 29 – November 1, 1981	50 mph (85 km/h)	998 hPa (29.47 inHg)	Azores	None	None	
Beryl	August 28 – September 6, 1982	70 mph (110 km/h)	989 hPa (29.21 inHg)	Cape Verde	$3 million	3	
Chris	September 9–12, 1982	65 mph (100 km/h)	994 hPa (29.35 inHg)	Southern United States	$2 million	None	
Ernesto	September 30 – October 2, 1982	70 mph (110 km/h)	997 hPa (29.44 inHg)	None	None	None	
Dean	September 26–30, 1983	65 mph (100 km/h)	999 hPa (29.50 inHg)	North Carolina, Virginia, Mid-Atlantic states	Minor	None	
Arthur	August 28 – September 5, 1984	50 mph (85 km/h)	1004 hPa (29.65 inHg)	None	None	None	
Bertha	August 30 – September 4, 1984	40 mph (65 km/h)	1007 hPa (29.74 inHg)	None	None	None	
Cesar	August 31 – September 2, 1984	60 mph (95 km/h)	991 hPa (29.26 inHg)	None	None	None	
Edouard	September 14–15, 1984	65 mph (100 km/h)	998 hPa (29.47 inHg)	Mexico	None	None	
Fran	September 15–20, 1984	65 mph (100 km/h)	994 hPa (29.35 inHg)	Cape Verde	$2.8 million	29–32	
Gustav	September 16–19, 1984	50 mph (85 km/h)	1006 hPa (29.71 inHg)	Bermuda	None	None	
Isidore	September 25 – October 1, 1984	60 mph (95 km/h)	999 hPa (29.50 inHg)	The Bahamas, Florida	$1 million	1	
Ana	July 15–19, 1985	70 mph (110 km/h)	996 hPa (29.41 inHg)	Atlantic Canada	None	None	
Fabian	September 15–19, 1985	65 mph (100 km/h)	994 hPa (29.35 inHg)	None	None	None	
Henri	September 21–25, 1985	60 mph (95 km/h)	996 hPa (29.41 inHg)	United States East Coast	Minimal	None	
Isabel	October 7–15, 1985	70 mph (110 km/h)	997 hPa (29.44 inHg)	Greater Antilles, Southeastern United States	$125 million	180	
Andrew	June 5–8, 1986	50 mph (85 km/h)	999 hPa (29.50 inHg)	The Carolinas	Minimal	1	
Danielle	September 7–10, 1986	60 mph (95 km/h)	1000 hPa (29.53 inHg)	Leeward Islands	$10.5 million	None	
Two	August 9–17, 1987	45 mph (75 km/h)	1007 hPa (29.74 inHg)	United States Gulf Coast	$7.4 million	None	
Bret	August 18–24, 1987	50 mph (85 km/h)	1000 hPa (29.53 inHg)	Cape Verde	None	None	
Cindy	September 5–10, 1987	50 mph (85 km/h)	1000 hPa (29.53 inHg)	None	None	None	
Dennis	September 8–20, 1987	50 mph (85 km/h)	1000 hPa (29.53 inHg)	None	None	None	
Alberto	August 5–8, 1988	40 mph (65 km/h)	1002 hPa (29.59 inHg)	United States East Coast, Atlantic Canada	None	None	
Beryl	August 8–10, 1988	50 mph (85 km/h)	1001 hPa (29.56 inHg)	United States Gulf Coast	$3 million	1	
Chris	August 21–29, 1988	50 mph (85 km/h)	1005 hPa (29.68 inHg)	The Caribbean, United States East Coast, Atlantic Canada	$2.2 million	6	
Ernesto	September 3–5, 1988	65 mph (100 km/h)	994 hPa (29.35 inHg)	None	None	None	
Unnamed	September 7–10, 1988	65 mph (100 km/h)	994 hPa (29.35 inHg)	Cape Verde	None	None	
Isaac	September 28 – October 1, 1988	45 mph (75 km/h)	1005 hPa (29.68 inHg)	Trinidad and Tobago	Unknown	2	
Keith	November 17–24, 1988	70 mph (110 km/h)	987 hPa (29.15 inHg)	Central America, Florida	$7.3 million	None	
Allison	June 24–27, 1989	50 mph (85 km/h)	999 hPa (29.50 inHg)	Texas, Louisiana	$500 million	11	
Barry	July 9 – 14, 1989	50 mph (85 km/h)	1005 hPa (29.68 inHg)	None	None	None	
Iris	September 16 – 21, 1989	70 mph (110 km/h)	1001 hPa (29.56 inHg)	None	None	None	
Karen	November 28 – December 4, 1989	60 mph (95 km/h)	1001 hPa (29.56 inHg)	Cuba	None	None	

== 1990s ==
Name	Duration	Peak intensity		Areas affected	Damage (USD)	Deaths	Refs
Name	Duration	Wind speed	Pressure	Areas affected	Damage (USD)	Deaths	Refs
Arthur	July 22–27, 1990	70 mph (110 km/h)	995 hPa (29.38 inHg)	Windward Islands, Greater Antilles	Mimimal	None	
Cesar	July 31 – August 7, 1990	50 mph (85 km/h)	1000 hPa (29.53 inHg)	None	None	None	
Edouard	August 2–11, 1990	45 mph (75 km/h)	1003 hPa (29.62 inHg)	Portugal	None	None	
Fran	August 11–14, 1990	40 mph (65 km/h)	1007 hPa (29.74 inHg)	Windward Islands, Venezuela	Minimal	None	
Hortense	August 25–31, 1990	65 mph (100 km/h)	993 hPa (29.32 inHg)	None	None	None	
Marco	October 9–12, 1990	65 mph (100 km/h)	989 hPa (29.21 inHg)	Florida, United States East Coast	$57 million	12	
Ana	July 2–5, 1991	50 mph (85 km/h)	1000 hPa (29.53 inHg)	Southeastern United States	Minimal	None	
Danny	September 7–11, 1991	50 mph (85 km/h)	998 hPa (29.47 inHg)	None	None	None	
Erika	September 8–12, 1991	60 mph (95 km/h)	997 hPa (29.44 inHg)	None	None	None	
Fabian	October 15–16, 1991	45 mph (75 km/h)	1002 hPa (29.59 inHg)	Cuba, Florida	Minimal	None	
Danielle	September 22–26, 1992	65 mph (100 km/h)	1001 hPa (29.56 inHg)	United States East Coast	Minor	2	
Earl	September 26 – October 3, 1992	65 mph (100 km/h)	990 hPa (29.23 inHg)	Florida, Georgia, North Carolina	None	None	
Arlene	June 18–21, 1993	40 mph (65 km/h)	1000 hPa (29.53 inHg)	El Salvador, Mexico, Texas, Louisiana	$60.8 million	26	
Bret	August 4–11, 1993	60 mph (95 km/h)	1002 hPa (29.59 inHg)	Windward Islands, Venezuela, Colombia, Central America	$35.7 million	213	
Cindy	August 14–17, 1993	45 mph (75 km/h)	1007 hPa (29.74 inHg)	Martinique, Dominican Republic, Puerto Rico	$19 million	4	
Dennis	August 23–28, 1993	50 mph (85 km/h)	1000 hPa (29.53 inHg)	None	None	None	
Alberto	June 30 – July 7, 1994	65 mph (100 km/h)	993 hPa (29.32 inHg)	Florida, Georgia, Alabama	$1 billion	32	
Beryl	August 14–19, 1994	60 mph (95 km/h)	999 hPa (29.50 inHg)	Eastern United States	$74.22 million	5	
Debby	September 9–11, 1994	70 mph (110 km/h)	1006 hPa (29.71 inHg)	Leeward Islands	$115 million	9	
Ernesto	September 21–26, 1994	60 mph (95 km/h)	997 hPa (29.44 inHg)	None	None	None	
Barry	July 5–10, 1995	70 mph (110 km/h)	989 hPa (29.21 inHg)	Atlantic Canada	None	None	
Chantal	July 12–20, 1995	70 mph (110 km/h)	991 hPa (29.26 inHg)	None	None	None	
Dean	July 28 – August 2, 1995	45 mph (75 km/h)	991 hPa (29.26 inHg)	Texas	$500 thousand	None	
Gabrielle	August 9–12, 1995	70 mph (110 km/h)	988 hPa (29.18 inHg)	Mexico	Unknown	6	
Jerry	August 22–28, 1995	40 mph (65 km/h)	1002 hPa (29.59 inHg)	Southeastern United States	$26.5 million	6	
Karen	August 26 – September 3, 1995	50 mph (85 km/h)	1000 hPa (29.53 inHg)	None	None	None	
Pablo	October 4–8, 1995	60 mph (95 km/h)	994 hPa (29.35 inHg)	None	None	None	
Sebastien	October 20–25, 1995	65 mph (100 km/h)	1001 hPa (29.56 inHg)	Lesser Antilles, Puerto Rico	None	None	
Arthur	June 17–21, 1996	45 mph (75 km/h)	1001 hPa (29.56 inHg)	North Carolina	$1 million	None	
Gustav	August 26 – September 2, 1996	45 mph (75 km/h)	1005 hPa (29.68 inHg)	None	None	None	
Josephine	October 4–8, 1996	70 mph (110 km/h)	981 hPa (28.97 inHg)	United States East Coast, Atlantic Canada	$130 million	3	
Kyle	October 11–12, 1996	50 mph (85 km/h)	1001 hPa (29.56 inHg)	Central America, Mexico	None	None	
Ana	June 30 – July 4, 1997	45 mph (75 km/h)	1000 hPa (29.53 inHg)	None	None	None	
Claudette	July 13–16, 1997	45 mph (75 km/h)	1003 hPa (29.62 inHg)	United States East Coast	None	None	
Fabian	October 4–8, 1997	45 mph (75 km/h)	1004 hPa (29.65 inHg)	Lesser Antilles	None	None	
Grace	October 16–17, 1997	45 mph (75 km/h)	999 hPa (29.50 inHg)	United States Virgin Islands, Puerto Rico, Hispaniola	$1.46 million	1	
Alex	July 27 – August 2, 1998	50 mph (85 km/h)	1002 hPa (29.59 inHg)	None	None	None	
Charley	August 21–24, 1998	70 mph (110 km/h)	1000 hPa (29.53 inHg)	Louisiana, Texas, Mexico	$50 million	13	
Frances	September 8–13, 1998	65 mph (100 km/h)	990 hPa (29.23 inHg)	Mexico, United States Gulf Coast	$500 million	2	
Hermine	September 17–20, 1998	45 mph (75 km/h)	999 hPa (29.50 inHg)	Louisiana, Mississippi, Alabama	Minor	None	
Arlene	June 11–18, 1999	60 mph (95 km/h)	1006 hPa (29.71 inHg)	Bermuda	Minimal	None	
Emily	August 24–28, 1999	50 mph (85 km/h)	1004 hPa (29.65 inHg)	None	None	None	
Harvey	September 19–22, 1999	60 mph (95 km/h)	994 hPa (29.35 inHg)	Southeastern United States, Atlantic Canada	$22.6 million	None	
Katrina	October 28 – November 1, 1999	40 mph (65 km/h)	999 hPa (29.50 inHg)	Central America, Mexico	$9 thousand	None	

== See also ==
- List of Eastern Pacific tropical storms
- List of Western Pacific tropical storms
