= List of Atlantic tropical storms (2000–present) =

This is a list of Atlantic tropical storms from the year 2000.

== 2000s ==
Name	Duration	Peak intensity		Areas affected	Damage (USD)	Deaths	Refs
Name	Duration	Wind speed	Pressure	Areas affected	Damage (USD)	Deaths	Refs
Beryl	August 13 – 15, 2000	50 mph (85 km/h)	1007 hPa (29.74 inHg)	Mexico, Texas	$27 million	1	
Chris	August 17 – 19, 2000	40 mph (65 km/h)	1008 hPa (29.77 inHg)	None	None	None	
Ernesto	September 1 – 3, 2000	40 mph (65 km/h)	1008 hPa (29.77 inHg)	None	None	None	
Helene	September 15 – 25, 2000	70 mph (110 km/h)	986 hPa (29.12 inHg)	The Antilles, Eastern United States, Atlantic Canada	$16 million	1	
Leslie	October 4 – 7, 2000	45 mph (75 km/h)	1006 hPa (29.71 inHg)	Florida	$950 million	3	
Nadine	October 19 – 22, 2000	60 mph (95 km/h)	999 hPa (29.50 inHg)	None	None	None	
Allison	June 5 – 17, 2001	60 mph (95 km/h)	1000 hPa (29.53 inHg)	United States Gulf Coast, United States East Coast, Atlantic Canada	$8.5 billion	50	
Barry	August 2 – 7, 2001	70 mph (110 km/h)	990 hPa (29.23 inHg)	United States Gulf Coast, United States East Coast, Atlantic Canada	$30 million	9	
Chantal	August 14 – 22, 2001	70 mph (110 km/h)	997 hPa (29.44 inHg)	Windward Islands, Jamaica, Belize, Mexico	$40 million	2	
Dean	August 22 – 28, 2001	70 mph (110 km/h)	994 hPa (29.35 inHg)	The Antilles, Eastern Canada	$7.7 million	None	
Jerry	October 6 – 8, 2001	50 mph (85 km/h)	1004 hPa (29.65 inHg)	Barbados, Windward Islands	None	None	
Lorenzo	October 27 – 31, 2001	40 mph (65 km/h)	1007 hPa (29.74 inHg)	None	None	None	
Arthur	July 14 – 16, 2002	60 mph (95 km/h)	997 hPa (29.44 inHg)	Northeastern United States	None	None	
Bertha	August 4 – 9, 2002	40 mph (65 km/h)	1007 hPa (29.74 inHg)	Mississippi	$200,000	1	
Cristobal	August 5 – 8, 2002	50 mph (85 km/h)	999 hPa (29.50 inHg)	Bermuda, New York	Minimal	3	
Edouard	September 1 – 6, 2002	65 mph (100 km/h)	1002 hPa (29.59 inHg)	Florida	Minor	None	
Fay	September 5 – 8, 2002	60 mph (95 km/h)	998 hPa (29.47 inHg)	Texas, Northern Mexico	>$5 million	None	
Hanna	September 12 – 15, 2002	60 mph (95 km/h)	1001 hPa (29.56 inHg)	South-eastern United States	$20 million	3	
Josephine	September 17 – 19, 2002	40 mph (65 km/h)	1006 hPa (29.71 inHg)	None	None	None	
Ana	April 20 – 24, 2003	60 mph (95 km/h)	994 hPa (29.35 inHg)	None	None	2	
Bill	June 28 – July 2, 2003	60 mph (95 km/h)	997 hPa (29.44 inHg)	Yucatán Peninsula, Southeastern United States	>$50 million	4	
Grace	August 30 – September 2, 2003	40 mph (65 km/h)	1007 hPa (29.74 inHg)	South-Central United States	$113,000	None	
Henri	September 3–8, 2003	60 mph (95 km/h)	997 hPa (29.44 inHg)	Florida	$196 million	None	
Larry	October 1–6, 2003	65 mph (100 km/h)	993 hPa (29.32 inHg)	Mexico	$53.6 million	5	
Mindy	October 10 – 14, 2003	45 mph (75 km/h)	1002 hPa (29.59 inHg)	Greater Antilles	$50,000	None	
Nicholas	October 13 – 23, 2003	70 mph (110 km/h)	990 hPa (29.23 inHg)	None	None	None	
Odette	December 4 – 7, 2003	65 mph (100 km/h)	993 hPa (29.32 inHg)	Hispaniola	$8 million	10	
Peter	December 7 – 11, 2003	70 mph (110 km/h)	990 hPa (29.23 inHg)	None	None	None	
Bonnie	August 3–14, 2004	65 mph (100 km/h)	1001 hPa (29.56 inHg)	Lesser Antilles, Hispaniola, Jamaica, Cuba, Yucatán Peninsula, United States East Coast	$1.27 million	4	
Earl	August 13–15, 2004	50 mph (85 km/h)	1009 hPa (29.80 inHg)	Windward Islands	Minimal	1	
Hermine	August 27–31, 2004	60 mph (95 km/h)	1002 hPa (29.59 inHg)	New England (Massachusetts), Atlantic Canada	Minimal	None	
Matthew	October 8–10, 2004	45 mph (75 km/h)	997 hPa (29.44 inHg)	Gulf Coast of the United States, Midwestern United States, Great Plains	Minimal	None	
Otto	November 29 – December 3, 2004	50 mph (85 km/h)	995 hPa (29.38 inHg)	None	None	None	
Arlene	June 8 – 13, 2005	70 mph (110 km/h)	989 hPa (29.21 inHg)	Yucatán Peninsula, Cayman Islands, Cuba, Eastern United States, Eastern Canada	Minor	1	
Bret	June 28 – 30, 2005	40 mph (65 km/h)	1002 hPa (29.59 inHg)	Central Mexico	$9.3 million	3	
Franklin	July 21 – 29, 2005	70 mph (110 km/h)	997 hPa (29.44 inHg)	None	None	None	
Gert	July 23 – 25, 2005	45 mph (75 km/h)	1005 hPa (29.68 inHg)	Mexico	$6 million	1	
Harvey	August 2 – 8, 2005	65 mph (100 km/h)	994 hPa (29.35 inHg)	Bermuda	None	None	
Jose	August 22 – 23, 2005	60 mph (95 km/h)	998 hPa (29.47 inHg)	Eastern Mexico	$45 million	16	
Lee	August 28 – September 2, 2005	40 mph (65 km/h)	1006 hPa (29.71 inHg)	None	None	None	
Tammy	October 5 – 6, 2005	50 mph (85 km/h)	1001 hPa (29.56 inHg)	Bahamas, Southeastern United States	$30 million	10	(Note: Refs:)
Alpha	October 22 – 24, 2005	50 mph (85 km/h)	998 hPa (29.47 inHg)	Hispaniola, Bahamas	Unknown	26	
Gamma	November 14 – 22, 2005	50 mph (85 km/h)	1002 hPa (29.59 inHg)	Lesser Antilles, Honduras, Belize	$18 million	37	
Delta	November 22 – 28, 2005	70 mph (110 km/h)	980 hPa (28.94 inHg)	Canary Islands	$364 million	7	
Zeta	December 30, 2005 – January 6, 2006	65 mph (100 km/h)	994 hPa (29.35 inHg)	None	None	None	
Alberto	June 10–14, 2006	70 mph (110 km/h)	995 hPa (29.38 inHg)	Southeastern United States	$420.000	3	
Beryl	July 18–21, 2006	60 mph (95 km/h)	1000 hPa (29.53 inHg)	Long Island, Massachusetts, Atlantic Canada	Minimal	None	
Chris	August 1–4, 2006	65 mph (100 km/h)	1001 hPa (29.56 inHg)	Leeward Islands, Puerto Rico, Turks & Caicos Islands, Hispaniola, Bahamas, eastern Cuba	Minimal	None	
Debby	August 21–26, 2006	50 mph (85 km/h)	999 hPa (29.50 inHg)	Capo Verde Islands	None	None	
Barry	June 1–2, 2007	60 mph (95 km/h)	997 hPa (29.44 inHg)	El Salvador, western Cuba, Florida, East Coast of the United States, Atlantic Canada	$118.000	3	
Chantal	July 31 – August 1, 2007	50 mph (85 km/h)	994 hPa (29.35 inHg)	Florida, Louisiana, Alabama, Mississippi, Georgia, Southeast U.S., Mid-Atlantic	$24.3 million	None	
Erin	August 15–17, 2007	40 mph (65 km/h)	1003 hPa (29.62 inHg)	Texas, Oklahoma, central United States	$248 million	21	
Gabrielle	September 8–11, 2007	60 mph (95 km/h)	1004 hPa (29.65 inHg)	North Carolina	Minimal	1	
Ingrid	September 12– 17, 2007	45 mph (75 km/h)	1002 hPa (29.59 inHg)	None	None	None	
Jerry	September 23–24, 2007	40 mph (65 km/h)	1003 hPa (29.62 inHg)	None	None	None	
Melissa	September 28–30, 2007	40 mph (65 km/h)	1005 hPa (29.68 inHg)	None	None	None	
Olga	December 11–13, 2007	60 mph (95 km/h)	1003 hPa (29.62 inHg)	Puerto Rico, Hispaniola, Yucatan Peninsula, central Florida	$45 million	40	
Arthur	May 31 – June 1, 2008	45 mph (75 km/h)	1004 hPa (29.65 inHg)	Honduras, Belize, Mexico, Guatemala	$78 million	9	
Cristobal	July 19–23, 2008	65 mph (100 km/h)	998 hPa (29.47 inHg)	lorida, The Carolinas, Atlantic Canada	None	$10.000	
Edouard	August 3–6, 2008	65 mph (100 km/h)	996 hPa (29.41 inHg)	United States Gulf Coast	$800.000	6	
Fay	August 15–27, 2008	70 mph (110 km/h)	986 hPa (29.12 inHg)	Greater Antilles, Southeastern United States	$560 million	36	
Josephine	September 2–6, 2008	65 mph (100 km/h)	994 hPa (29.35 inHg)	Cabo Verde, Leeward Islands	Minimal	None	
Laura	September 29 – October 1, 2008	60 mph (95 km/h)	994 hPa (29.35 inHg)	Azores, Atlantic Canada, Greenland, Europe	Minimal	None	
Marco	October 6–7, 2008	40 mph (65 km/h)	998 hPa (29.47 inHg)	Mexico	Minimal	None	
Nana	October 12–14, 2008	40 mph (65 km/h)	1004 hPa (29.65 inHg)	None	None	None	
Ana	August 11–16, 2009	40 mph (65 km/h)	1003 hPa (29.62 inHg)	Lesser Antilles, Puerto Rico, Hispaniola, Cuba and The Bahama	Minimal	None	
Claudette	August 16–18, 2009	60 mph (95 km/h)	1005 hPa (29.68 inHg)	Southeastern United States	$350.000	2	
Danny	August 26–29, 2009	60 mph (95 km/h)	1006 hPa (29.71 inHg)	United States East Coast	Minimal	1	
Erika	September 1–3, 2009	50 mph (85 km/h)	1004 hPa (29.65 inHg)	esser Antilles, Puerto Rico and the Dominican Republic	$35.000	None	
Grace	October 4–6, 2009	65 mph (100 km/h)	986 hPa (29.12 inHg)	Azores, Portugal, British Isles	Minimal	None	
Henri	October 6 – 8, 2009	50 mph (85 km/h)	1005 hPa (29.68 inHg)	Antilles	None	None	

== 2010s ==
Name	Duration	Peak intensity		Areas affected	Damage (USD)	Deaths	Refs
Name	Duration	Wind speed	Pressure	Areas affected	Damage (USD)	Deaths	Refs
Bonnie	July 22–24, 2010	45 mph (75 km/h)	1005 hPa (29.68 inHg)	Puerto Rico, Hispaniola, Turks and Caicos, Bahamas, Florida	$1.36 million	1	
Colin	August 2–8, 2010	60 mph (95 km/h)	1005 hPa (29.68 inHg)	Leeward Islands, Bermuda, The Carolinas and New England	Minimal	1	
Fiona	August 30 – September 3, 2010	65 mph (100 km/h)	998 hPa (29.47 inHg)	Leeward Islands, Bermuda	Minimal	None	
Gaston	September 1–2, 2010	40 mph (65 km/h)	1005 hPa (29.68 inHg)	Leeward Islands, Puerto Rico	None	None	
Hermine	September 3–9, 2010	70 mph (110 km/h)	989 hPa (29.21 inHg)	Central America, Mexico, Texas, Oklahoma, Kansas	$740 million	102	
Matthew	September 23–26, 2010	60 mph (95 km/h)	998 hPa (29.47 inHg)	Venezuela, Central America, Mexico, Jamaica	$171 million	126	
Nicole	September 28– 29, 2010	45 mph (75 km/h)	995 hPa (29.38 inHg)	Cayman Islands, Jamaica, Cuba, Florida, Bahamas, United States East Coas	$245 million	20	
Arlene	June 28 – July 1, 2011	65 mph (100 km/h)	993 hPa (29.32 inHg)	Central America, Mexico, Gulf Coast of the United States	$223 million	22	
Bret	July 17–22, 2011	70 mph (110 km/h)	995 hPa (29.38 inHg)	Bahamas, Bermuda, East Coast of the United States	Minimal	None	
Cindy	July 20–22, 2011	70 mph (110 km/h)	994 hPa (29.35 inHg)	Bermuda	None	None	
Don	July 27–30, 2011	50 mph (85 km/h)	997 hPa (29.44 inHg)	Greater Antilles, Yucatán Peninsula, Northeastern Mexico	None	None	
Emily	August 2–7, 2011	50 mph (85 km/h)	1003 hPa (29.62 inHg)	Antilles, Florida, Bahamas	$5 million	5	
Franklin	August 12–13, 2011	45 mph (75 km/h)	1004 hPa (29.65 inHg)	Bermuda	None	None	
Gert	August 13–16, 2011	65 mph (100 km/h)	1000 hPa (29.53 inHg)	Bermuda	None	None	
Harvey	August 19–22, 2011	65 mph (100 km/h)	994 hPa (29.35 inHg)	Lesser Antilles, Greater Antilles, Central America, East Mexico	Minimal	5	
Jose	August 27–29, 2011	45 mph (75 km/h)	1006 hPa (29.71 inHg)	Bermuda	None	None	
Lee	September 2–5, 2011	60 mph (95 km/h)	986 hPa (29.12 inHg)	United States Gulf Coast and Eastern United States	$28 million	18	
Sean	November 8–11, 2011	65 mph (100 km/h)	982 hPa (29.00 inHg)	Bermuda	Minimal	1	
Alberto	May 19–22, 2012	60 mph (95 km/h)	995 hPa (29.38 inHg)	Southeastern United States	Minimal	None	
Beryl	May 26–30, 2012	70 mph (110 km/h)	992 hPa (29.29 inHg)	Cuba, The Bahamas, Southeastern United States	Minimal	3	
Debby	June 23–27, 2012	65 mph (100 km/h)	990 hPa (29.23 inHg)	Cuba, Central America, Southeastern United States, Bermuda	$250 million	8	
Florence	August 3–6, 2012	60 mph (95 km/h)	1002 hPa (29.59 inHg)	Cape Verde	None	None	
Helene	August 9–18, 2012	45 mph (75 km/h)	1004 hPa (29.65 inHg)	Windward Islands, Trinidad and Tobago, Central America, Mexico	$17 million	2	
Joyce	August 22–24, 2012	40 mph (65 km/h)	1006 hPa (29.71 inHg)	None	None	None	
Oscar	October 3–5, 2012	50 mph (85 km/h)	994 hPa (29.35 inHg)	None	None	None	
Patty	October 11–13, 2012	45 mph (75 km/h)	1005 hPa (29.68 inHg)	The Bahamas	None	None	
Tony	October 22–25, 2012	55 mph (85 km/h)	1000 hPa (29.53 inHg)	None	None	None	
Andrea	June 5–7, 2013	65 mph (100 km/h)	992 hPa (29.29 inHg)	Yucatán Peninsula, Cuba, United States East Coast, Atlantic Canada	$86.000	4	
Barry	June 17–20, 2013	45 mph (75 km/h)	1003 hPa (29.62 inHg)	Central America, Mexico	$256 million	5	
Chantal	July 7–10, 2013	65 mph (100 km/h)	1003 hPa (29.62 inHg)	Puerto Rico, Hispaniola, Lesser Antilles, US Virgin Islands, Haiti	$10 million	1	
Dorian	July 23 – August 3, 2013	60 mph (95 km/h)	1002 hPa (29.59 inHg)	The Bahamas, Florida	None	None	
Erin	August 15–18, 2013	45 mph (75 km/h)	1006 hPa (29.71 inHg)	Cape Verde	None	None	
Fernand	August 25–26, 2013	60 mph (95 km/h)	1001 hPa (29.56 inHg)	Eastern Mexico	$1 million	14	
Gabrielle	September 4–13, 2013	65 mph (100 km/h)	1003 hPa (29.62 inHg)	Lesser Antilles, Puerto Rico, Hispaniola, Bermuda, Atlantic Canada	Minimal	None	
Jerry	September 29 – October 3, 2013	50 mph (85 km/h)	1005 hPa (29.68 inHg)	Azores	None	None	
Karen	October 3–6, 2013	65 mph (100 km/h)	998 hPa (29.47 inHg)	Yucatán Peninsula, Gulf Coast of the United States, Eastern United States	$18.000	None	
Lorenzo	October 21–24, 2013	50 mph (85 km/h)	1000 hPa (29.53 inHg)	None	None	None	
Melissa	November 18–21, 2013	65 mph (100 km/h)	980 hPa (28.94 inHg)	Azores	None	None	
Dolly	September 1–3, 2014	50 mph (85 km/h)	1000 hPa (29.53 inHg)	Eastern and Northeastern Mexico, Texas	$22.2 million	1	
Hanna	October 22–28, 2014	40 mph (65 km/h)	1000 hPa (29.53 inHg)	Southeastern Mexico, Central America	Unknown	None	
Ana	May 8–11, 2015	60 mph (95 km/h)	998 hPa (29.47 inHg)	Southeastern United States	Minimal	2	
Bill	June 16–18, 2015	60 mph (95 km/h)	997 hPa (29.44 inHg)	Central America, Yucatán Peninsula, Southern and Midwestern United States, Northeastern United States, Atlantic Canada	$100 million	9	
Claudette	July 13–14, 2015	50 mph (85 km/h)	1003 hPa (29.62 inHg)	East Coast of the United States, Newfoundland	None	None	
Erika	August 25–29, 2015	50 mph (85 km/h)	1001 hPa (29.56 inHg)	Lesser Antilles, Greater Antilles, Florida	$511 million	35	
Grace	September 5–9, 2015	60 mph (95 km/h)	1000 hPa (29.53 inHg)	None	None	None	
Henri	September 8–11, 2015	50 mph (85 km/h)	1003 hPa (29.62 inHg)	None	None	None	
Ida	September 18–27, 2015	55 mph (85 km/h)	1001 hPa (29.56 inHg)	None	None	None	
Bonnie	May 27 – June 4, 2016	45 mph (75 km/h)	1006 hPa (29.71 inHg)	The Bahamas, Southeastern United States	$640.000	2	
Colin	June 5–7, 2016	50 mph (85 km/h)	1001 hPa (29.56 inHg)	Yucatán Peninsula, Greater Antilles, East Coast of the United States	$1.04 million	6	
Danielle	June 19–21, 2016	45 mph (75 km/h)	1007 hPa (29.74 inHg)	Yucatán Peninsula, Eastern Mexico	Minimal	1	
Fiona	August 16–23, 2016	55 mph (85 km/h)	1004 hPa (29.65 inHg)	None	None	None	
Ian	September 12–16, 2016	60 mph (95 km/h)	994 hPa (29.35 inHg)	None	none	None	
Julia	September 13– 18, 2016	50 mph (85 km/h)	1007 hPa (29.74 inHg)	The Bahamas, Southeastern United States	$6.1 million	None	
Karl	September 14–25, 2016	70 mph (110 km/h)	988 hPa (29.18 inHg)	Cape Verde, Bermuda	Minimal	None	
Lisa	September 19–25, 2016	50 mph (85 km/h)	999 hPa (29.50 inHg)	None	None	None	
Arlene	April 19–21, 2017	50 mph (85 km/h)	990 hPa (29.23 inHg)	None	None	None	
Bret	June 19–20, 2017	50 mph (85 km/h)	1007 hPa (29.74 inHg)	Trinidad and Tobago, Guyana, Venezuela, Windward Islands	$3 million	2	
Cindy	June 20–23, 2017	60 mph (95 km/h)	991 hPa (29.26 inHg)	Central America, Yucatán Peninsula, Cayman Islands, Cuba, Southern United States, Eastern United States	25 million	3	
Don	June 28 – July 2, 2017	50 mph (85 km/h)	1005 hPa (29.68 inHg)	Windward Islands, Barbados, Trinidad and Tobago	None	None	
Emily	July 30 – August 2, 2017	60 mph (95 km/h)	1001 hPa (29.56 inHg)	Florida	$10 million	None	
Philippe	October 28–29, 2017	40 mph (65 km/h)	1000 hPa (29.53 inHg)	Central America, Cayman Islands, Yucatán Peninsula, Cuba, East Coast of the United States	$100 million	5	
Rina	November 5– 9, 2017	60 mph (95 km/h)	991 hPa (29.26 inHg)	None	None	None	
Alberto	May 25–31, 2018	65 mph (100 km/h)	990 hPa (29.23 inHg)	Yucatán Peninsula, Cuba, Eastern United States, Canad	$125 million	18	
Debby	August 7–9, 2018	50 mph (85 km/h)	998 hPa (29.47 inHg)	None	None	None	
Ernesto	August 15–17, 2018	45 mph (75 km/h)	1003 hPa (29.62 inHg)	Western Europe	None	None	
Gordon	September 3–6, 2018	70 mph (110 km/h)	996 hPa (29.41 inHg)	Greater Antilles, The Bahamas, Gulf Coast of the United States, Eastern United States, Ontario	$200 million	4	
Joyce	September 12 – 18, 2018	50 mph (85 km/h)	995 hPa (29.38 inHg)	None	None	None	
Kirk	September 22 - 28, 2018	65 mph (100 km/h)	998 hPa (29.47 inHg)	Barbados, Windward Islands, Guadeloupe	$6.2 million	2	
Nadine	October 9–12, 2018	65 mph (100 km/h)	995 hPa (29.38 inHg)	None	None	None	
Chantal	August 20–23, 2019	40 mph (65 km/h)	1007 hPa (29.74 inHg)	None	None	None	
Erin	August 26–29, 2019	40 mph (65 km/h)	1002 hPa (29.59 inHg)	Cuba, The Bahamas, United States East Coast, Atlantic Canada	Minimal	None	
Fernand	September 3–5, 2019	50 mph (85 km/h)	1000 hPa (29.53 inHg)	Northeastern Mexico, South Texas	$11.3 million	1	
Gabrielle	September 3– 10, 2019	65 mph (100 km/h)	995 hPa (29.38 inHg)	None	None	None	
Imelda	September 17–19, 2019	45 mph (75 km/h)	1003 hPa (29.62 inHg)	Texas, Louisiana, Oklahoma, Arkansas	5 billion	7	
Karen	September 22–27, 2019	45 mph (75 km/h)	1003 hPa (29.62 inHg)	Windward Islands, Trinidad and Tobago, Venezuela, US Virgin Islands, British Virgin Islands, Puerto Rico	$3.5 million	None	
Melissa	October 11–14, 2019	65 mph (100 km/h)	994 hPa (29.35 inHg)	Southeastern United States, Mid-Atlantic States, New England, Atlantic Canada	$24.000	None	
Nestor	October 18–19, 2019	60 mph (95 km/h)	996 hPa (29.41 inHg)	Central America, Yucatan Peninsula, Southeastern United States	$150 million	3	
Olga	October 25, 2019	45 mph (75 km/h)	998 hPa (29.47 inHg)	Central United States, Great Lakes region	400 million	2	
Sebastien	November 19–24, 2019	70 mph (110 km/h)	991 hPa (29.26 inHg)	Leeward Islands, Azores, British Isles	Minimal	None	

== 2020s ==
Name	Duration	Peak intensity		Areas affected	Damage (USD)	Deaths	Refs
Name	Duration	Wind speed	Pressure	Areas affected	Damage (USD)	Deaths	Refs
Arthur	May 16 – 19, 2020	60 mph (95 km/h)	990 hPa (29.23 inHg)	Southeastern United States, The Bahamas, Bermuda	$112,000	None	
Bertha	May 27 – 28, 2020	50 mph (85 km/h)	1005 hPa (29.68 inHg)	Southeastern United States, The Bahamas	$130,000	1	
Cristobal	June 1 – 9, 2020	60 mph (95 km/h)	988 hPa (29.18 inHg)	Central America, Mexico, Central United States	$665 million	6	
Dolly	June 22 – 24, 2020	45 mph (75 km/h)	1000 hPa (29.53 inHg)	None	None	None	
Edouard	July 4 – 6, 2020	50 mph (85 km/h)	1003 hPa (29.62 inHg)	Bermuda	Minimal	None	
Fay	July 9 – 11, 2020	60 mph (95 km/h)	998 hPa (29.47 inHg)	United States East Coast	$220 million	6	
Gonzalo	July 21–25, 2020	65 mph (100 km/h)	997 hPa (29.44 inHg)	Windward Islands, Trinidad and Tobago, Venezuela	Minimal	None	
Josephine	August 11–16, 2020	45 mph (75 km/h)	1004 hPa (29.65 inHg)	None	None	None	
Kyle	August 14–15, 2020	50 mph (85 km/h)	1001 hPa (29.56 inHg)	The Carolinas	None	None	
Omar	August 31 – September 5, 2020	40 mph (65 km/h)	1004 hPa (29.65 inHg)	Southeastern United States, Bermuda	None	None	
Rene	September 7–14, 2020	45 mph (75 km/h)	1001 hPa (29.56 inHg)	Cabo Verde	Minimal	None	
Vicky	September 14–17, 2020	50 mph (85 km/h)	1001 hPa (29.56 inHg)	Cabo Verde	Minimal	1	
Wilfred	September 17–21, 2020	40 mph (65 km/h)	1006 hPa (29.71 inHg)	None	None	None	
Beta	September 17–22, 2020	65 mph (100 km/h)	993 hPa (29.32 inHg)	Mexico, Gulf Coast of the United States	$225 million	1	
Theta	November 10–15, 2020	70 mph (110 km/h)	987 hPa (29.15 inHg)	Canary Islands, Madeira	Minimal	None	
Ana	May 22 – 23, 2021	45 mph (75 km/h)	1004 hPa (29.65 inHg)	Bermuda	Minimal	None	
Bill	June 14 – 15, 2021	65 mph (100 km/h)	992 hPa (29.29 inHg)	United States East Coast, Atlantic Canada	None	None	
Claudette	June 19 – 22, 2021	45 mph (75 km/h)	1003 hPa (29.62 inHg)	Mexico, United States Gulf Coast, Georgia, Carolinas, Atlantic Canada	$375 million	14	
Danny	June 27 – 29, 2021	45 mph (75 km/h)	1009 hPa (29.80 inHg)	Southeastern United States	$5,000	None	
Fred	August 11 – 17, 2021	65 mph (100 km/h)	991 hPa (29.26 inHg)	Antilles, The Bahamas, Eastern United States, Atlantic Canada	$1.3 billion	7	
Kate	August 28 – September 1, 2021	45 mph (75 km/h)	1004 hPa (29.65 inHg)	None	None	None	
Julian	August 28 – 30, 2021	60 mph (95 km/h)	993 hPa (29.32 inHg)	None	None	None	
Mindy	September 8 – 9, 2021	60 mph (95 km/h)	1000 hPa (29.53 inHg)	Colombia, Central America, Mexico, Southeastern United States	$76 million	23	
Odette	September 17 – 18, 2021	45 mph (75 km/h)	1005 hPa (29.68 inHg)	United States East Coast, Atlantic Canada	None	None	
Peter	September 19 – 22, 2021	50 mph (85 km/h)	1005 hPa (29.68 inHg)	Hispaniola, Leeward Islands, Puerto Rico	$12,000	None	
Rose	September 19 – 21, 2021	60 mph (95 km/h)	1004 hPa (29.65 inHg)	None	None	None	
Victor	September 29 – October 4, 2021	65 mph (100 km/h)	997 hPa (29.44 inHg)	None	None	None	
Wanda	October 30 – November 7, 2021	60 mph (95 km/h)	983 hPa (29.03 inHg)	United States East Coast, Atlantic Canada	$200 million	2	
Alex	June 5– 6, 2022	70 mph (110 km/h)	984 hPa (29.06 inHg)	Yucatán Peninsula, Western Cuba, Florida, Northern Bahamas, Bermuda	$375 million	4	
Bonnie	July 1–2, 2022	60 mph (95 km/h)	996 hPa (29.41 inHg)	Trinidad and Tobago, Grenada, Leeward Antilles, Colombia, Costa Rica, Nicaragua	$25 million	4	
Colin	July 1–2, 2022	40 mph (65 km/h)	1011 hPa (29.85 inHg)	Southeastern United States	Minimal	1	
Gaston	September 20–25, 2022	65 mph (100 km/h)	994 hPa (29.35 inHg)	Azores	None	None	
Hermine	September 23–24, 2022	40 mph (65 km/h)	1004 hPa (29.65 inHg)	Canary Islands	$9.8 million	None	
Karl	October 11–14, 2022	60 mph (95 km/h)	997 hPa (29.44 inHg)	Southern Mexico		3	
Arlene	June 1–3, 2023	40 mph (65 km/h)	998 hPa (29.47 inHg)	South Florida, Western Cuba	$50,000	None	
Bret	June 19–24, 2023	70 mph (110 km/h)	996 hPa (29.41 inHg)	Windward Islands, Aruba, Colombia	$445,000	None	
Cindy	June 22–26, 2023	60 mph (95 km/h)	1004 hPa (29.65 inHg)	None	None	None	
Gert	August 19 – September 4, 2023	60 mph (95 km/h)	998 hPa (29.47 inHg)	None	None	None	
Emily	August 20–21, 2023	50 mph (85 km/h)	998 hPa (29.47 inHg)	None	None	None	
Harold	August 21–23, 2023	60 mph (95 km/h)	995 hPa (29.38 inHg)	Southwestern United States, Northern Mexico	$505,000	1	
Jose	August 29 – September 1, 2023	65 mph (100 km/h)	996 hPa (29.41 inHg)	None	None	None	
Katia	August 31 – September 4, 2023	60 mph (95 km/h)	998 hPa (29.47 inHg)	None	None	None	
Ophelia	September 22–23, 2023	70 mph (110 km/h)	981 hPa (28.97 inHg)	United States East Coast	$450 million	None	
Philippe	September 23 – October 6, 2023	60 mph (95 km/h)	998 hPa (29.47 inHg)	Northern Leeward Islands, Bermuda	$3.4 million	None	
Rina	September 28 – October 1, 2023	50 mph (85 km/h)	999 hPa (29.50 inHg)	None	None	None	
Sean	October 10 – 15, 2023	45 mph (75 km/h)	1005 hPa (29.68 inHg)	None	None	None	
Alberto	June 19 – 20, 2024	50 mph (85 km/h)	992 hPa (29.29 inHg)	Yucatán Peninsula, Northeastern Mexico, Texas, Louisiana	$179 million	5	
Chris	June 30 – July 1, 2024	45 mph (75 km/h)	1005 hPa (29.68 inHg)	Yucatán Peninsula, Northeastern Mexico, Texas	$1 million	6	
Gordon	September 11 – 17, 2024	45 mph (75 km/h)	1004 hPa (29.65 inHg)	Cabo Verde Islands	None	None	
Joyce	September 27 – 30, 2024	50 mph (85 km/h)	1001 hPa (29.56 inHg)	None	None	None	
Nadine	October 19 – 20, 2024	60 mph (95 km/h)	1000 hPa (29.53 inHg)	Southeastern Mexico, Central America	$101 million	13	
Patty	November 1 – 4, 2024	65 mph (100 km/h)	982 hPa (29.00 inHg)	Azores	Minor	None	
Sara	November 14 – 18, 2024	50 mph (85 km/h)	997 hPa (29.44 inHg)	Dominican Republic, Central America	$139 million	4	
Andrea	June 23 – 24, 2025	40 mph (65 km/h)	1014 hPa (29.94 inHg)	None	None	None	
Barry	June 28 – 30, 2025	45 mph (75 km/h)	1006 hPa (29.71 inHg)	Northern Central America, Yucatán Peninsula, Eastern Mexico, Texas	$32.5 million	8	
Chantal	July 4 – 7, 2025	60 mph (95 km/h)	1002 hPa (29.59 inHg)	United States East Coast, Atlantic Canada	$500 million	6	
Dexter	August 3 – 6, 2025	60 mph (95 km/h)	999 hPa (29.50 inHg)	None	None	None	
Fernand	August 23 – 27, 2025	60 mph (95 km/h)	999 hPa (29.50 inHg)	None	None	None	
Jerry	October 7 – 11, 2025	65 mph (100 km/h)	1000 hPa (29.53 inHg)	Lesser Antilles	Minimal	1	
Lorenzo	October 13 – 15, 2025	60 mph (95 km/h)	1000 hPa (29.53 inHg)	None	None	None	
Arthur	June 17 – 18, 2026	45 mph (75 km/h)	999 hPa (29.50 inHg)	Northeast Mexico, Gulf Coast of the United States	$1 billion	4	
Bertha	July 19 – 24, 2026	60 mph (95 km/h)	995 hPa (29.38 inHg)	Gulf Coast of the United States	$10 million	None	
Cristobal	August 12 – 13, 2026	45 mph (75 km/h)	1008 hPa (29.77 inHg)	None	None	None	
Dolly	August 27 – 28, 2026	40 mph (65 km/h)	1007 hPa (29.74 inHg)	Antilles	Minimal	None	
Edouard	August 31 – September 3, 2026	60 mph (95 km/h)	996 hPa (29.41 inHg)	Gulf Coast of the United States	$10 million	None	
Fay	September 19 – 29, 2026	70 mph (110 km/h)	995 hPa (29.38 inHg)	None	None	None	
Gonzalo	September 25 – 26, 2026	50 mph (85 km/h)	1000 hPa (29.53 inHg)	Cape Verde, The Gambia	Minimal	None	
Hanna	September 28 – 30, 2026	45 mph (75 km/h)	1002 hPa (29.59 inHg)	None	None	None	

== See also ==
- List of Eastern Pacific tropical storms
- List of Western Pacific tropical storms
