= List of Eastern Pacific tropical storms =

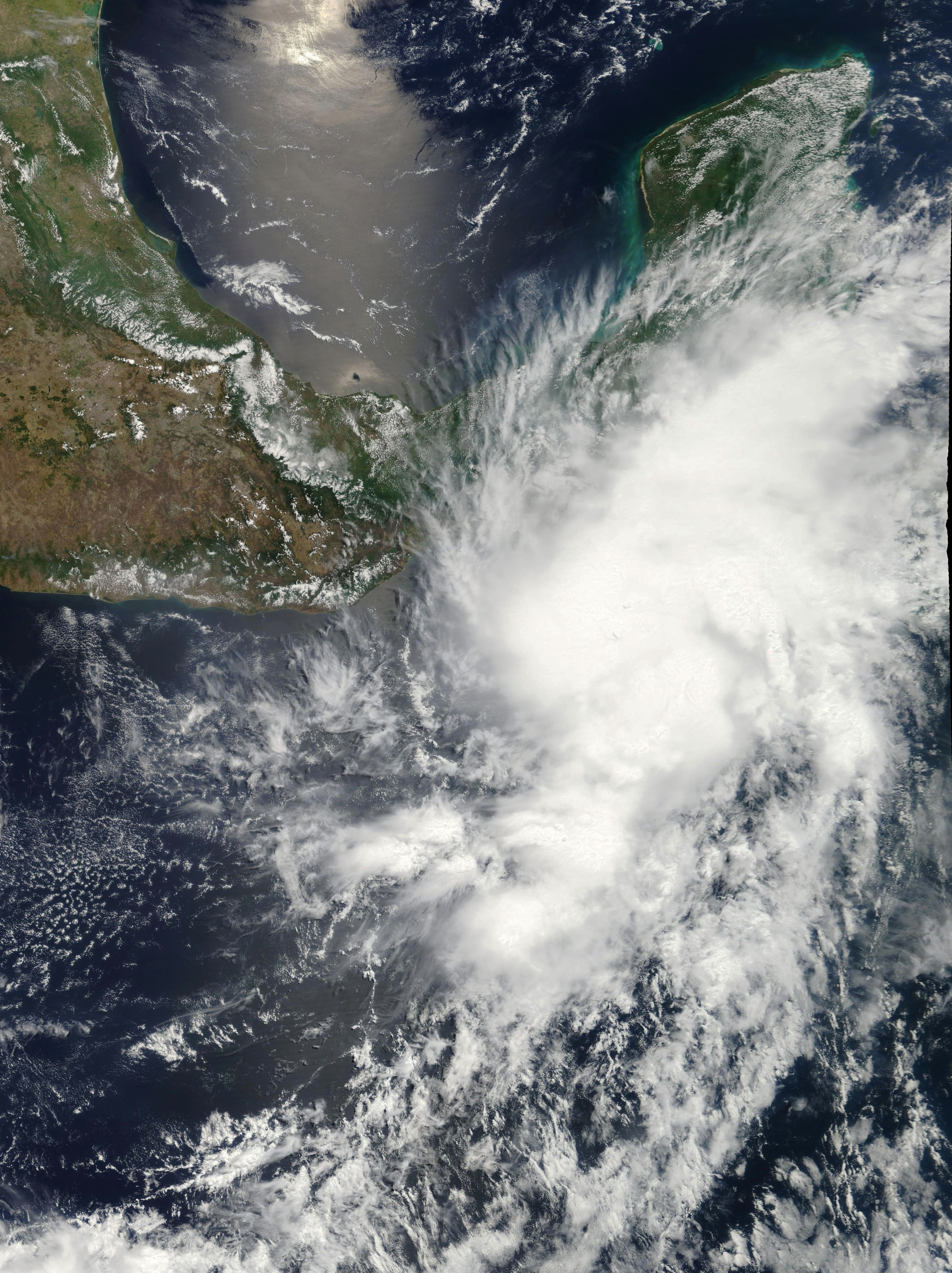
Tropical Storm Agatha, one of the deadliest and most destructive Eastern Pacific tropical storms, off the coast of Guatemala on May 29, 2010.

Tropical storms are tropical cyclones with 1-minute sustained winds between 34–63 knots (39–72 mph; 63–117 km/h). Tropical cyclones that attain such winds and make landfall while maintaining that intensity are capable of causing minor to moderate damage to human lives and infrastructure. Since 1949, at least 490 systems have peaked at tropical storm intensity in the Eastern Pacific basin, which is denoted as the part of the Pacific Ocean north of the equator and east of the International Date Line. This list does not include storms that also attained Category 1, 2, 3, 4, or 5 status on the Saffir–Simpson scale.

There are a plethora of factors that influence tropical cyclogenesis, the formation of tropical cyclones, in the Northeastern Pacific. The North Pacific High and Aleutian Low which occur from December to April, produce strong upper-level winds which prevent the formation of tropical cyclones. During the summer and early autumn months, sea surface temperatures are generally warm enough to support tropical cyclone development in the Northeast Pacific, and perhaps even rapid intensification. Additionally, El Niño events cause more powerful hurricanes to form by generating weaker wind shear and higher sea surface temperatures, while La Niña events reduce the number of such hurricanes by doing the opposite.

== Background ==
A tropical cyclone achieves tropical storm status when it possesses maximum sustained winds between 34 knots (39 mph; 63 km/h; 17 m/s) and 63 knots (72 mph; 117 km/h; 32 m/s). The National Hurricane Center (NHC) takes sustained winds to be the average wind speed measured over the period of one minute at the height of 10 metres (33 ft) above the ground. Should a tropical storm make landfall, it has the potential to cause minor to moderate damage to human infrastructure, with debris carried by the winds capable of bringing injury or death to humans and animals.

The Northeast Pacific tropical cyclone basin is defined as the region of the Pacific Ocean north of the equator and east of the International Date Line. The Northeast Pacific is further divided into two sub-basins, namely the east and central Pacific. The east Pacific runs east of the 140th meridian west, and tropical cyclones occurring there are warned upon by the National Hurricane Center, the current Regional Specialized Meteorological Center (RSMC) for that area. The central Pacific, running from the 140th meridian west to the International Date Line, currently has the Central Pacific Hurricane Center as its RSMC. Tropical cyclones are generally much rarer in the central Pacific than in the east Pacific, with an average of just four to five storms forming or moving into the central Pacific compared to around 15 for the east Pacific. All tropical cyclones recorded by past and present RSMCs of the Northeast Pacific basin since 1949 are listed in the Northeast and North Central Pacific hurricane database (HURDAT), which is compiled and maintained by the National Hurricane Center.

== Climatology ==
Before 1970, tropical cyclones within the Northeast Pacific were classified into three categories: tropical depression, tropical storm, and hurricane; these were assigned intensities of 30 mph (50 km/h), 50 mph (80 km/h), and 85 mph (135 km/h) respectively. Exceptions to these rules would be storms that affected humans and as such humans were able to measure or estimate wind speeds or pressure data. Hurricane season in the Northeast Pacific tropical cyclone basin begins on May 15 in the east Pacific and June 1 in the central Pacific, and ends on November 30. Since 1949, a total of 490 tropical storms have developed in the Northeast Pacific basin.

The formation and development of tropical cyclones, termed tropical cyclogenesis, requires high sea surface temperatures of at least 26.5 °C (79.7 °F) and low vertical wind shear. When these conditions are met, a pre-existing tropical disturbance – usually a tropical wave – can develop into a tropical cyclone, provided the disturbance is far enough from the Equator to experience a sufficiently strong Coriolis force which is responsible for the counterclockwise rotation of hurricanes in the Northern Hemisphere. During the winter and spring months of December to April, sea surface temperatures in the tropics are usually too low to support development. Also, the presence of a semi-permanent high-pressure area known as the North Pacific High in the eastern Pacific greatly suppresses formation of tropical cyclones in the winter, as the North Pacific High results in vertical wind shear that causes environmental conditions to be unconducive to tropical cyclone formation. Another factor preventing tropical cyclones from forming during the winter is the presence of a semi-permanent low-pressure area called the Aleutian Low between January and April. Its effects in the central Pacific near the 160th meridian west cause tropical waves that form in the area to drift northward into the Gulf of Alaska and dissipate or become extratropical. Its retreat in late-April allows the warmth of the Pacific High to meander in, bringing its powerful clockwise wind circulation with it. The Intertropical Convergence Zone departs southward in mid-May permitting the formation of the earliest tropical waves, coinciding with the start of the eastern Pacific hurricane season on May 15. During summer and autumn, sea surface temperatures rise further to reach near 29 °C (84 °F) in July and August, well above the 26.5 °C (79.7 °F) threshold for tropical cyclogenesis. This allows for hurricanes developing during that time to strengthen significantly.

The El Niño–Southern Oscillation also influences the frequency and intensity of hurricanes in the Northeast Pacific basin. During years with the existence of an El Niño event, sea surface temperatures increase in the Northeast Pacific and average vertical wind shear decreases, resulting in an increase in activity; the opposite happens in the Atlantic basin during El Niño, where increased wind shear creates an unfavorable environment for tropical cyclone formation. Contrary to El Niño, La Niña increases wind shear and decreases sea surface temperatures over the eastern Pacific, while reducing wind shear and increasing sea surface temperatures over the Atlantic.

Within the Northeast Pacific, tropical cyclones generally head west out into the open Pacific Ocean, steered by the westward trade windss. Closer to the end of the season, however, some storms are steered northwards or northeastwards around the subtropical ridge nearer the end of the season, and may bring impacts to the western coasts of Mexico and occasionally even Central America. In the central Pacific basin, the North Pacific High keeps tropical cyclones away from the Hawaiian Islands by forcing them southwards. Combined with cooler waters around the Hawaiian Islands that tend to weaken approaching tropical cyclones, this makes direct impacts on the Hawaiian Islands by tropical cyclones rare.

== Systems ==
Key

- † Discontinuous duration (weakened below tropical storm then restrengthened to that classification at least once)
- ‡ Intensified past tropical storm intensity after exiting basin
- # Storm made landfall, see below for further information
- § Pressure listed was not at peak intensity (Note: Prior to 1988 for the Eastern Pacific and 2001 for the Central Pacific, pressure data was only able from direct measurements by reconnaissance aircraft that penetrated the storm or reports from ships and land-based weather stations, or estimates derived from satellite imagery. Should any reading or estimate be available, the lowest is listed below.)

=== 1949–1959 ===
| Name | Dates as a tropical storm (Note: Dates are given in Coordinated Universal Time.) | Duration (hours) | Sustained wind speeds | Pressure | Areas affected | Deaths | Damage (USD) (Note: All damage values are in USD of their respective years.) | Refs |
|---|---|---|---|---|---|---|---|---|
| One | June 11–12, 1949 | 42 | 50 mph (85 km/h) | Unknown | Western Mexico | None | Unknown | |
| Two | June 17–23, 1949 | 150 | 50 mph (85 km/h) | Unknown | None | None | None | |
| Three | September 3–8, 1949 | 150 | 50 mph (85 km/h) | Unknown | Baja California Peninsula | None | None | |
| Five | September 17–19, 1949 | 54 | 50 mph (85 km/h) | Unknown | Western Mexico | None | Unknown | |
| Four | August 12, 1950 | 12 | 50 mph (85 km/h) | Unknown | None | None | None | |
| One | May 17–21, 1951 | 90 | 50 mph (85 km/h) | Unknown | Southern Mexico# | Unknown | Unknown | |
| Three | June 26–27, 1951 | 30 | 50 mph (85 km/h) | Unknown | Western Mexico | Unknown | Unknown | |
| Four | July 5–6, 1951 | 30 | 50 mph (85 km/h) | Unknown | Western Mexico | Unknown | Unknown | |
| Five | August 3–10, 1951 | 174 | 50 mph (85 km/h) | Unknown | None | None | None | |
| Six | August 24–29, 1951 | 114 | 50 mph (85 km/h) | Unknown | Baja California# | Unknown | Unknown | |
| Seven | September 11–15, 1951 | 102 | 50 mph (85 km/h) | Unknown | Western Mexico | None | None | |
| Nine | November 27–30, 1951 | 78 | 50 mph (85 km/h) | Unknown | Western Mexico | None | None | |
| One | May 29–31, 1952 | 54 | 50 mph (85 km/h) | Unknown | | | | |
| Two | June 12–16, 1952 | 102 | 50 mph (85 km/h) | Unknown | | | | |
| Three | July 19–21, 1952 | 54 | 50 mph (85 km/h) | Unknown | | | | |
| Six | September 26–28, 1952 | 54 | 50 mph (85 km/h) | Unknown | | | | |
| One | August 25–27, 1953 | 54 | 50 mph (85 km/h) | Unknown | | | | |
| Two | September 9–10, 1953 | 30 | 50 mph (85 km/h) | Unknown | | | | |
| One | June 18–22, 1954 | 114 | 50 mph (85 km/h) | Unknown | | | | |
| Two | July 10–16, 1954 | 150 | 50 mph (85 km/h) | Unknown | | | | |
| Five | September 2–9, 1954 | 174 | 50 mph (85 km/h) | Unknown | | | | |
| Six | September 5–8, 1954 | 90 | 50 mph (85 km/h) | Unknown | | | | |
| Seven | September 15–21, 1954 | 150 | 50 mph (85 km/h) | Unknown | | | | |
| Eight | September 21–27, 1954 | 162 | 50 mph (85 km/h) | Unknown | | | | |
| Ten | October 12–14, 1954 | 60 | 50 mph (85 km/h) | Unknown | | | | |
| Two | June 8–11, 1955 | 78 | 50 mph (85 km/h) | Unknown | | | | |
| Three | July 6–9, 1955 | 66 | 50 mph (85 km/h) | Unknown | | | | |
| Four | September 1–5, 1955 | 102 | 50 mph (85 km/h) | Unknown | | | | |
| Five | October 1–4, 1955 | 78 | 50 mph (85 km/h) | Unknown | | | | |
| Two | May 30–June 3, 1956 | 114 | 50 mph (85 km/h) | Unknown | | | | |
| Six | July 14–16, 1956 | 54 | 50 mph (85 km/h) | Unknown | | | | |
| Eight | September 3, 1956 | 24 | 50 mph (85 km/h) | Unknown | | | | |
| Eleven | October 16–18, 1956 | 42 | 50 mph (85 km/h) | Unknown | | | | |
| Five | September 9–10, 1957 | 48 | 50 mph (85 km/h) | Unknown | None | None | None | |
| Seven | September 20–23, 1957 | 66 | 50 mph (85 km/h) | Unknown | None | None | None | |
| Eight | September 25–27, 1957 | 60 | 50 mph (85 km/h) | Unknown | None | None | None | |
| Nine | September 26–27, 1957 | 24 | 50 mph (85 km/h) | Unknown | None | None | None | |
| Two | June 13–15, 1958 | 54 | 50 mph (85 km/h) | Unknown | | | | |
| Five | July 26–30, 1958 | 90 | 50 mph (85 km/h) | Unknown | | | | |
| Six | July 31–August 1, 1958 | 30 | 50 mph (85 km/h) | Unknown | | | | |
| Seven | August 7, 1958 | 6 | 50 mph (85 km/h) | Unknown | | | | |
| Eight | August 13–14, 1958 | 42 | 50 mph (85 km/h) | Unknown | | | | |
| Ten | September 11–12, 1958 | 42 | 50 mph (85 km/h) | Unknown | | | | |
| Twelve | October 14–17, 1958 | 66 | 50 mph (85 km/h) | Unknown | | | | |
| Thirteen | October 29–30, 1958 | 30 | 50 mph (85 km/h) | Unknown | | | | |
| One | June 10–12, 1959 | 66 | 50 mph (85 km/h) | Unknown | | | | |
| Two | June 26–28, 1959 | 54 | 50 mph (85 km/h) | Unknown | | | | |
| Clara | July 16–22, 1959 | 150 | 50 mph (85 km/h) | Unknown | | | | |
| Four | July 22–25, 1959 | 90 | 50 mph (85 km/h) | Unknown | | | | |
| Five | July 29–30, 1959 | 30 | 50 mph (85 km/h) | Unknown | | | | |
| Seven | August 4–6, 1959 | 42 | 50 mph (85 km/h) | Unknown | | | | |
| Eight | August 19–21, 1959 | 48 | 50 mph (85 km/h) | Unknown | | | | |
| Nine | August 27–29, 1959 | 54 | 50 mph (85 km/h) | Unknown | | | | |
| Wanda | September 26–27, 1959 | 42 | 70 mph (110 km/h) | Unknown | | | | |
| Fourteen | October 19–21, 1959 | 54 | 50 mph (85 km/h) | Unknown | | | | |
Overall reference for name, dates, duration, winds and pressure:

=== 1960–1969 ===
| Name | Dates as a tropical storm | Duration (hours) | Sustained wind speeds | Pressure | Areas affected | Deaths | Damage (USD) | Refs |
|---|---|---|---|---|---|---|---|---|
| Annette | June 9–12, 1960 | 90 | 50 mph (85 km/h) | Unknown | | | | |
| Bonny | June 22–26, 1960 | 102 | 50 mph (85 km/h) | Unknown | | | | |
| Joanne | July 10–12, 1961 | 54 | 50 mph (85 km/h) | Unknown | | | | |
| Kathleen | July 14–16, 1961 | 42 | 50 mph (85 km/h) | Unknown | | | | |
| Liza | July 15–19, 1961 | 114 | 50 mph (85 km/h) | Unknown | | | | |
| Naomi | August 4–5, 1961 | 42 | 50 mph (85 km/h) | Unknown | | | | |
| Orla | September 6–11, 1961 | 114 | 50 mph (85 km/h) | Unknown | | | | |
| Pauline | October 3–4, 1961 | 30 | 50 mph (85 km/h) | Unknown | | | | |
| Rebecca | October 3–4, 1961 | 30 | 50 mph (85 km/h) | Unknown | | | | |
| Willa | July 8–10, 1962 | 66 | 50 mph (85 km/h) | Unknown | | | | |
| Ava | August 16–20, 1962 | 90 | 50 mph (85 km/h) | Unknown | | | | |
| Four | August 20–22, 1962 | 42 | 50 mph (85 km/h) | Unknown | | | | |
| Bernice | September 2–6, 1962 | 114 | 50 mph (85 km/h) | Unknown | | | | |
| Claudia | September 20–24, 1962 | 114 | 50 mph (85 km/h) | Unknown | | 1 | $11 million | |
| Eight | September 26–30, 1962 | 114 | 50 mph (85 km/h) | Unknown | | | | |
| Four | August 6–8, 1963 | 66 | 50 mph (85 km/h) | Unknown | | | | |
| Jen–Kath | September 9–18, 1963 | 222 | 50 mph (85 km/h) | Unknown | | | | |
| Irah | September 12–15, 1963 | 78 | 50 mph (85 km/h) | Unknown | | | | |
| Lillian | September 24–29, 1963 | 114 | 50 mph (85 km/h) | Unknown | | | | |
| Natalie | July 6–7, 1964 | 42 | 50 mph (85 km/h) | Unknown | | | | |
| Prudence | July 20–24, 1964 | 114 | 50 mph (85 km/h) | Unknown | | | | |
| Rosalyn | August 21–22, 1964 | 42 | 50 mph (85 km/h) | Unknown | | | | |
| Tillie | September 7–9, 1964 | 54 | 50 mph (85 km/h) | Unknown | | | | |
| Victoria | June 5–7, 1965 | 54 | 50 mph (85 km/h) | Unknown | | | | |
| Wallie | June 17–18, 1965 | 24 | 50 mph (85 km/h) | Unknown | | | | |
| Ava | June 29–July 3, 1965† | 84 | 50 mph (85 km/h) | Unknown | | | | |
| Bernice | June 30–July 8, 1965 | 186 | 50 mph (85 km/h) | Unknown | | | | |
| Claudia | August 8–11, 1965 | 66 | 50 mph (85 km/h) | Unknown | | | | |
| Doreen | August 21–31, 1965 | 246 | 50 mph (85 km/h) | Unknown | | | | |
| Florence | September 9–11, 1965 | 66 | 50 mph (85 km/h) | Unknown | | | | |
| Glenda | September 13–22, 1965 | 222 | 50 mph (85 km/h) | Unknown | | | | |
| Hazel | September 24–27, 1965 | 60 | 50 mph (85 km/h) | Unknown | | 6 | $10 million | |
Overall reference for name, dates, duration, winds and pressure:

=== 1970–1979 ===
| Name | Dates as a tropical storm | Duration (hours) | Sustained wind speeds | Pressure | Areas affected | Deaths | Damage (USD) | Refs |
Overall reference for name, dates, duration, winds and pressure:

=== 1980–1989 ===
| Name | Dates as a tropical storm | Duration (hours) | Sustained wind speeds | Pressure | Areas affected | Deaths | Damage (USD) | Refs |
|---|---|---|---|---|---|---|---|---|
| Carmen | April 4–9, 1980 | 90 | 50 mph (85 km/h) | Unknown | None | | | |
Overall reference for name, dates, duration, winds and pressure:

=== 1990–1999 ===
| Name | Dates as a tropical storm | Duration (hours) | Sustained wind speeds | Pressure | Areas affected | Deaths | Damage (USD) | Refs |
|---|---|---|---|---|---|---|---|---|
| Cristina | July 2–3, 1996 | 42 | 70 mph (110 km/h) | 991 hPa (29.26 inHg) | Southern Mexico# | 13 | Unknown | |
| Elida | September 2–5, 1996 | 78 | 65 mph (100 km/h) | 994 hPa (29.35 inHg) | Baja California Peninsula | 6 | Minimal | |
| Genevieve | September 28–October 8, 1996† | 114 | 50 mph (85 km/h) | 999 hPa (29.50 inHg) | None | —N/a | | |
| Andres | June 2–6, 1997 | 90 | 50 mph (85 km/h) | 998 hPa (29.47 inHg) | Mexico, El Salvador, Nicaragua# | 4 | Minimal | |
| Blanca | June 10–11, 1997 | 48 | 45 mph (75 km/h) | 1,002 hPa (29.59 inHg) | Mexico | —N/a | Minimal | |
| Carlos | June 25–27, 1997 | 36 | 50 mph (85 km/h) | 996 hPa (29.41 inHg) | None | —N/a | —N/a | |
| Hilda | August 11–14, 1997 | 60 | 50 mph (85 km/h) | 1,000 hPa (29.53 inHg) | None | —N/a | —N/a | |
| Ignacio | August 17–18, 1997 | 18 | 40 mph (65 km/h) | 1,005 hPa (29.68 inHg) | California, Pacific Northwest | —N/a | Minimal | |
| Oliwa | September 3–4, 1997 | 30 | 40 mph (65 km/h)‡ | 1,004 hPa (29.65 inHg) | None | —N/a | —N/a | |
| Kevin | September 4–6, 1997 | 48 | 65 mph (100 km/h) | 994 hPa (29.35 inHg) | None | —N/a | —N/a | |
| Marty | September 14–15, 1997 | 36 | 45 mph (75 km/h) | 1,002 hPa (29.59 inHg) | None | —N/a | —N/a | |
| Olaf | September 25–28, 1997 | 54 | 70 mph (110 km/h) | 989 hPa (29.21 inHg) | Mexico, El Salvador, Guatemala# | 18 | Unknown | |
| Paka | December 2–7, 1997 | 108 | 65 mph (100 km/h)‡ | 992 hPa (29.29 inHg) | None | —N/a | —N/a | |
| Agatha | June 13–15, 1998 | 60 | 65 mph (100 km/h) | 993 hPa (29.32 inHg) | None | —N/a | —N/a | |
| Celia | July 17–20, 1998 | 66 | 60 mph (95 km/h) | 997 hPa (29.44 inHg) | Baja California Peninsula, Revillagigedo Islands, California | —N/a | Unknown | |
| Frank | August 8–9, 1998 | 36 | 45 mph (75 km/h) | 1,001 hPa (29.56 inHg) | Baja California Peninsula, Southwestern United States (Arizona) | 3 | —N/a | |
| Javier | September 7–13, 1998† | 78 | 60 mph (95 km/h) | 995 hPa (29.38 inHg) | Revillagigedo Islands, Southwestern Mexico# | —N/a | Unknown | |
| Calvin | July 25–26, 1999 | 24 | 40 mph (65 km/h) | 1,005 hPa (29.68 inHg) | None | —N/a | —N/a | |
| Fernanda | August 18–20, 1999 | 72 | 65 mph (100 km/h) | 994 hPa (29.35 inHg) | Socorro Island | —N/a | —N/a | |
| Irwin | October 8–10, 1999 | 54 | 60 mph (95 km/h) | 996 hPa (29.41 inHg) | Southwestern Mexico (Guerrero) | —N/a | Minimal | |
Overall reference for name, dates, duration, winds and pressure:

=== 2000–2009 ===
| Name | Dates as a tropical storm | Duration (hours) | Sustained wind speeds | Pressure | Areas affected | Deaths | Damage (USD) | Refs |
|---|---|---|---|---|---|---|---|---|
| Bud | June 13–16, 2000 | 72 | 50 mph (85 km/h) | 994 hPa (29.35 inHg) | Revillagigedo Islands, Baja California Peninsula | —N/a | Minimal | |
| Upana | July 20–22, 2000 | 48 | 45 mph (75 km/h) | 1,006 hPa (29.71 inHg) | None | —N/a | —N/a | |
| Emilia | July 26–29, 2000 | 72 | 65 mph (100 km/h) | 994 hPa (29.35 inHg) | Clarion Island, Revillagigedo Islands | —N/a | —N/a | |
| Fabio | August 4–5, 2000 | 48 | 50 mph (85 km/h) | 1,000 hPa (29.53 inHg) | None | —N/a | —N/a | |
| Ileana | August 14–16, 2000 | 66 | 70 mph (110 km/h) | 991 hPa (29.26 inHg) | Baja California Peninsula, Northwestern Mexico | —N/a | —N/a | |
| Wene | August 16–17, 2000 | 36 | 50 mph (85 km/h) | 1,002 hPa (29.59 inHg) | None | —N/a | —N/a | |
| John | August 28–31, 2000 | 84 | 70 mph (110 km/h) | 994 hPa (29.35 inHg) | None | —N/a | —N/a | |
| Kristy | September 2, 2000 | 18 | 40 mph (65 km/h) | 1,004 hPa (29.65 inHg) | None | —N/a | —N/a | |
| Miriam | September 16, 2000 | 12 | 40 mph (65 km/h) | 1,004 hPa (29.65 inHg) | Northwestern Mexico, Baja California | —N/a | $558 thousand | |
| Norman | September 20–21, 2000 | 18 | 50 mph (85 km/h) | 998 hPa (29.47 inHg) | Southwestern Mexico, Arizona, Texas# | 9 | $13.3 million | |
| Olivia | October 3–9, 2000 | 150 | 65 mph (100 km/h) | 994 hPa (29.35 inHg) | Southwestern United States | —N/a | —N/a | |
| Paul | October 26–27, 2000 | 36 | 45 mph (75 km/h) | 1,003 hPa (29.62 inHg) | Hawaii | —N/a | $70 million | |
| Rosa | November 5–8, 2000 | 72 | 65 mph (100 km/h) | 993 hPa (29.32 inHg) | Southwestern Mexico, Central America# | —N/a | $15 thousand | |
| Barbara | June 20–22, 2001 | 48 | 60 mph (95 km/h) | 997 hPa (29.44 inHg) | Hawaiian Islands | —N/a | —N/a | |
| Cosme | July 13–14, 2001 | 30 | 45 mph (75 km/h) | 1,000 hPa (29.53 inHg) | Baja California Peninsula, Socorro Island | —N/a | —N/a | |
| Erick | July 21–23, 2001 | 42 | 40 mph (65 km/h) | 1,001 hPa (29.56 inHg) | None | —N/a | —N/a | |
| Henriette | September 5–8, 2001 | 78 | 65 mph (100 km/h) | 994 hPa (29.35 inHg) | None | —N/a | —N/a | |
| Ivo | September 11–14, 2001 | 72 | 50 mph (85 km/h) | 997 hPa (29.44 inHg) | Southwestern Mexico, Baja California Peninsula | —N/a | —N/a | |
| Lorena | October 2–4, 2001 | 48 | 65 mph (100 km/h) | 996 hPa (29.41 inHg) | Southwestern Mexico (Guerrero) | —N/a | Minimal | |
| Manuel | October 11–17, 2001† | 90 | 60 mph (95 km/h) | 997 hPa (29.44 inHg) | None | —N/a | —N/a | |
| Boris | June 9–10, 2002 | 42 | 60 mph (95 km/h) | 997 hPa (29.44 inHg) | Southwestern Mexico | —N/a | Minimal | |
| Cristina | July 12–15, 2002 | 78 | 65 mph (100 km/h) | 994 hPa (29.35 inHg) | None | —N/a | —N/a | |
| Alika | August 25–26, 2002 | 48 | 65 mph (100 km/h) | 995 hPa (29.38 inHg) | None | —N/a | —N/a | |
| Genevieve | August 27–30, 2002 | 84 | 70 mph (110 km/h) | 989 hPa (29.21 inHg) | None | —N/a | —N/a | |
| Iselle | September 16–19, 2002 | 90 | 70 mph (110 km/h) | 990 hPa (29.23 inHg) | Baja California Peninsula | —N/a | Minimal | |
| Julio | September 25–26, 2002 | 24 | 45 mph (75 km/h) | 1,000 hPa (29.53 inHg) | Southwestern Mexico# | 3 | Minimal | |
| Lowell | October 23–29, 2002† | 78 | 50 mph (85 km/h) | 1,002 hPa (29.59 inHg) | Hawaii | —N/a | —N/a | |
| Andres | May 20–25, 2003 | 120 | 60 mph (95 km/h) | 997 hPa (29.44 inHg) | None | —N/a | —N/a | |
| Blanca | June 17–20, 2003 | 72 | 60 mph (95 km/h) | 997 hPa (29.44 inHg) | None | —N/a | —N/a | |
| Carlos | June 26–27, 2003 | 24 | 65 mph (100 km/h) | 996 hPa (29.41 inHg) | Southwestern Mexico# | 9 | $8 million | |
| Dolores | July 6, 2003 | 12 | 40 mph (65 km/h) | 1,005 hPa (29.68 inHg) | None | —N/a | —N/a | |
| Enrique | July 11–13, 2003 | 54 | 65 mph (100 km/h) | 993 hPa (29.32 inHg) | None | —N/a | —N/a | |
| Felicia | July 18–20, 2003 | 48 | 50 mph (85 km/h) | 1,000 hPa (29.53 inHg) | None | —N/a | —N/a | |
| Guillermo | August 8–11, 2003 | 84 | 60 mph (95 km/h) | 997 hPa (29.44 inHg) | None | —N/a | —N/a | |
| Hilda | August 10–11, 2003 | 42 | 40 mph (65 km/h) | 1,004 hPa (29.65 inHg) | None | —N/a | —N/a | |
| Kevin | September 4, 2003 | 6 | 40 mph (65 km/h) | 1,000 hPa (29.53 inHg) | None | —N/a | —N/a | |
| Agatha | May 22–23, 2004 | 36 | 60 mph (95 km/h) | 997 hPa (29.44 inHg) | Revillagigedo Islands, Clarion Island, Southwestern Mexico | —N/a | —N/a | |
| Blas | July 12–14, 2004 | 48 | 65 mph (100 km/h) | 991 hPa (29.26 inHg) | Northwestern Mexico, Baja California Peninsula, Southwestern United States | —N/a | —N/a | |
| Estelle | August 20–22, 2004 | 66 | 70 mph (110 km/h) | 989 hPa (29.21 inHg) | None | —N/a | —N/a | |
| Georgette | August 26–30, 2004 | 84 | 65 mph (100 km/h) | 995 hPa (29.38 inHg) | None | —N/a | —N/a | |
| Kay | October 5, 2004 | 12 | 45 mph (75 km/h) | 1,004 hPa (29.65 inHg) | None | —N/a | —N/a | |
| Lester | October 12–13, 2004 | 18 | 50 mph (85 km/h) | 1,000 hPa (29.53 inHg) | Southwestern Mexico | —N/a | —N/a | |
| Beatriz | June 22–23, 2005 | 36 | 50 mph (85 km/h) | 1,000 hPa (29.53 inHg) | None | —N/a | —N/a | |
| Calvin | June 26–28, 2005 | 42 | 50 mph (85 km/h) | 1,000 hPa (29.53 inHg) | Southwestern Mexico | —N/a | Minimal | |
| Dora | July 4–5, 2005 | 36 | 45 mph (75 km/h) | 1,002 hPa (29.59 inHg) | Southwestern Mexico | —N/a | Minimal | |
| Eugene | July 18–20, 2005 | 48 | 70 mph (110 km/h) | 989 hPa (29.21 inHg) | Baja California Peninsula | 1 | Minimal | |
| Greg | August 11–14, 2005 | 78 | 50 mph (85 km/h) | 1,000 hPa (29.53 inHg) | None | —N/a | —N/a | |
| Irwin | August 26–27, 2005 | 48 | 50 mph (85 km/h) | 1,000 hPa (29.53 inHg) | Southwestern Mexico | —N/a | —N/a | |
| Lidia | September 17–18, 2005 | 24 | 40 mph (65 km/h) | 1,005 hPa (29.68 inHg) | None | —N/a | —N/a | |
| Norma | September 23–26, 2005 | 78 | 60 mph (95 km/h) | 997 hPa (29.44 inHg) | None | —N/a | —N/a | |
| Aletta | May 27–29, 2006 | 48 | 45 mph (75 km/h) | 1,002 hPa (29.59 inHg) | Southwestern Mexico | —N/a | Minimal | |
| Emilia | July 22–27, 2006 | 126 | 65 mph (100 km/h) | 990 hPa (29.23 inHg) | Southwestern and Western Mexico, Baja California Peninsula, Southwestern United States | —N/a | —N/a | |
| Fabio | August 1–2, 2006 | 48 | 50 mph (85 km/h) | 1,000 hPa (29.53 inHg) | None | —N/a | —N/a | |
| Gilma | August 1–2, 2006 | 18 | 40 mph (65 km/h) | 1,004 hPa (29.65 inHg) | None | —N/a | —N/a | |
| Miriam | September 16–18, 2006 | 42 | 45 mph (75 km/h) | 999 hPa (29.50 inHg) | None | —N/a | —N/a | |
| Norman | October 9–10, 2006 | 30 | 50 mph (85 km/h) | 1,000 hPa (29.53 inHg) | Southwestern and Western Mexico | —N/a | —N/a | |
| Olivia | October 10–11, 2006 | 30 | 45 mph (75 km/h) | 1,000 hPa (29.53 inHg) | None | —N/a | —N/a | |
| Rosa | November 9, 2006 | 18 | 40 mph (65 km/h) | 1,002 hPa (29.59 inHg) | None | —N/a | —N/a | |
| Alvin | May 29–30, 2007 | 30 | 40 mph (65 km/h) | 1,003 hPa (29.62 inHg) | None | —N/a | —N/a | |
| Barbara | May 30–June 2, 2007† | 72 | 50 mph (85 km/h) | 1,000 hPa (29.53 inHg) | Southwestern Mexico# | 4 | $55 million | |
| Dalila | July 24–27, 2007 | 78 | 60 mph (95 km/h) | 1,004 hPa (29.65 inHg) | Baja California Sur, Jalisco, Socorro Island | 11 | Minimal | |
| Erick | July 1, 2007 | 24 | 40 mph (65 km/h) | 1,004 hPa (29.65 inHg) | None | —N/a | —N/a | |
| Gil | August 29–31, 2007 | 54 | 45 mph (75 km/h) | 1,001 hPa (29.56 inHg) | Western Mexico | 1 | Minimal | |
| Juliette | September 29–October 1, 2007 | 60 | 60 mph (95 km/h) | 997 hPa (29.44 inHg) | None | —N/a | —N/a | |
| Kiko | October 16–22, 2007† | 138 | 70 mph (110 km/h) | 991 hPa (29.26 inHg) | Western Mexico | 15 | —N/a | |
| Alma | May 29–30, 2008 | 24 | 65 mph (100 km/h) | 994 hPa (29.35 inHg) | Central America# | 11 | $35 million | |
| Cristina | June 28–30, 2008 | 48 | 50 mph (85 km/h) | 999 hPa (29.50 inHg) | None | —N/a | —N/a | |
| Douglas | July 2–3, 2008 | 30 | 40 mph (65 km/h) | 1,003 hPa (29.62 inHg) | Northwestern Mexico, Baja California Peninsula | —N/a | —N/a | |
| Kika | August 7–10, 2008 | 78 | 40 mph (65 km/h) | 1,007 hPa (29.74 inHg) | None | —N/a | —N/a | |
| Iselle | August 13–15, 2008 | 54 | 50 mph (85 km/h) | 999 hPa (29.50 inHg) | None | —N/a | —N/a | |
| Julio | August 23–25, 2008 | 54 | 50 mph (85 km/h) | 998 hPa (29.47 inHg) | Northwestern Mexico, Baja California Sur, Sinaloa, Arizona# | 2 | $1 million | |
| Karina | September 2, 2008 | 12 | 40 mph (65 km/h) | 1,000 hPa (29.53 inHg) | Socorro Island | —N/a | —N/a | |
| Lowell | September 7–10, 2008 | 78 | 50 mph (85 km/h) | 998 hPa (29.47 inHg) | Northwestern Mexico, Baja California Peninsula, Southwestern United States# | 6 | $15.5 million | |
| Odile | October 9–12, 2008 | 72 | 60 mph (95 km/h) | 997 hPa (29.44 inHg) | Nicaragua, Honduras, El Salvador, Guatemala, Southwestern Mexico | —N/a | Minimal | |
| Polo | November 3–4, 2008 | 48 | 45 mph (75 km/h) | 1,002 hPa (29.59 inHg) | None | —N/a | —N/a | |
| Blanca | July 6–8, 2009 | 48 | 50 mph (85 km/h) | 998 hPa (29.47 inHg) | Western Mexico, California | —N/a | Minimal | |
| Dolores | July 15–16, 2009 | 30 | 60 mph (95 km/h) | 997 hPa (29.44 inHg) | Clarion Island | —N/a | —N/a | |
| Lana | July 30–August 2, 2009 | 72 | 65 mph (100 km/h) | 995 hPa (29.38 inHg) | None | —N/a | —N/a | |
| Enrique | August 4–6, 2009 | 72 | 65 mph (100 km/h) | 994 hPa (29.35 inHg) | None | —N/a | —N/a | |
| Maka | August 11, 2009 | 12 | 40 mph (65 km/h) | 1,008 hPa (29.77 inHg) | None | —N/a | —N/a | |
| Hilda | August 22–26, 2009 | 102 | 65 mph (100 km/h) | 995 hPa (29.38 inHg) | None | —N/a | —N/a | |
| Ignacio | August 25–27, 2009 | 54 | 50 mph (85 km/h) | 999 hPa (29.50 inHg) | None | —N/a | —N/a | |
| Kevin | August 29–31, 2009 | 36 | 50 mph (85 km/h) | 1,000 hPa (29.53 inHg) | None | —N/a | —N/a | |
| Marty | September 16–18, 2009 | 54 | 45 mph (75 km/h) | 1,002 hPa (29.59 inHg) | None | —N/a | —N/a | |
| Nora | September 23–24, 2009 | 42 | 60 mph (95 km/h) | 997 hPa (29.44 inHg) | None | —N/a | —N/a | |
| Olaf | October 1–3, 2009 | 36 | 45 mph (75 km/h) | 996 hPa (29.41 inHg) | Baja California Peninsula | —N/a | —N/a | |
| Patricia | October 12–14, 2009 | 54 | 60 mph (95 km/h) | 996 hPa (29.41 inHg) | Baja California Peninsula, Northwest Mexico | —N/a | Minimal | |
Overall reference for name, dates, duration, winds and pressure:

=== 2010–2019 ===
| Name | Dates as a tropical storm | Duration (hours) | Sustained wind speeds | Pressure | Areas affected | Deaths | Damage (USD) | Refs |
|---|---|---|---|---|---|---|---|---|
| Agatha | May 29–30, 2010 | 24 | 45 mph (75 km/h) | 1,001 hPa (29.56 inHg) | Southwestern Mexico (Chiapas), Central America (Guatemala)# | 204 | $1.11 billion | |
| Blas | June 17–20, 2010 | 84 | 65 mph (100 km/h) | 994 hPa (29.35 inHg) | None | —N/a | —N/a | |
| Estelle | August 6–9, 2010 | 78 | 65 mph (100 km/h) | 994 hPa (29.35 inHg) | Southwestern Mexico, Western Mexico, Northwestern Mexico | —N/a | —N/a | |
| Georgette | September 20–21, 2010 | 30 | 40 mph (65 km/h) | 999 hPa (29.50 inHg) | Baja California Peninsula, Northwestern Mexico# | 1 | Minimal | |
| Omeka | December 20–21, 2010 | 30 | 60 mph (95 km/h) | 997 hPa (29.44 inHg) | Hawaii | —N/a | —N/a | |
| Fernanda | August 16–19, 2011 | 84 | 70 mph (115 km/h) | 992 hPa (29.29 inHg) | None | —N/a | —N/a | |
| Aletta | May 15–17, 2012 | 54 | 50 mph (85 km/h) | 1,000 hPa (29.53 inHg) | None | —N/a | —N/a | |
| Hector | August 11–15, 2012 | 90 | 50 mph (85 km/h) | 995 hPa (29.38 inHg) | Western Mexico, Baja California Peninsula | —N/a | Minimal | |
| John | September 2–3, 2012 | 36 | 45 mph (75 km/h) | 1,000 hPa (29.53 inHg) | Baja California Peninsula | —N/a | Minimal | |
| Kristy | September 12–16, 2012 | 102 | 60 mph (95 km/h) | 998 hPa (29.47 inHg) | Baja California Peninsula | —N/a | Minimal | |
| Norman | September 28–29, 2012 | 24 | 50 mph (85 km/h) | 997 hPa (29.44 inHg) | Western Mexico, Baja California Peninsula, Northwestern Mexico, Texas# | 1 | Minimal | |
| Olivia | October 6–8, 2012 | 54 | 60 mph (95 km/h) | 997 hPa (29.44 inHg) | None | —N/a | —N/a | |
| Rosa | October 30–November 3, 2012 | 96 | 50 mph (85 km/h) | 1,001 hPa (29.56 inHg) | None | —N/a | —N/a | |
| Alvin | May 15–17, 2013 | 36 | 60 mph (95 km/h) | 1,000 hPa (29.53 inHg) | None | —N/a | —N/a | |
| Flossie | July 25–29, 2013 | 114 | 70 mph (110 km/h) | 994 hPa (29.35 inHg) | Hawaii | —N/a | $24 thousand | |
| Pewa | August 16–18, 2013 | 48 | 65 mph (100 km/h)‡ | 1,000 hPa (29.53 inHg) | None | —N/a | —N/a | |
| Unala | August 19, 2013 | 6 | 40 mph (65 km/h) | 1,005 hPa (29.68 inHg) | None | —N/a | —N/a | |
| Ivo | 23–24 August 2013 | 48 | 45 mph (75 km/h) | 997 hPa (29.44 inHg) | Baja California Peninsula, Western United States | 1 | $30 thousand | |
| Juliette | 28–29 August 2013 | 42 | 65 mph (100 km/h) | 997 hPa (29.44 inHg) | Western Mexico, Baja California Peninsula, Northwestern Mexico# | 1 | Minimal | |
| Lorena | September 5–7, 2013 | 48 | 50 mph (85 km/h) | 1,002 hPa (29.59 inHg) | Western Mexico, Baja California Peninsula | —N/a | Minimal | |
| Narda | October 7–8, 2013 | 48 | 65 mph (100 km/h) | 997 hPa (29.44 inHg) | None | —N/a | —N/a | |
| Octave | October 13–15, 2013 | 60 | 65 mph (100 km/h) | 994 hPa (29.35 inHg) | Baja California Peninsula, Northwestern Mexico# | —N/a | Minimal | |
| Priscilla | October 14–15, 2013 | 36 | 45 mph (75 km/h) | 1,001 hPa (29.56 inHg) | None | —N/a | —N/a | |
| Sonia | November 3–4, 2013 | 35 | 45 mph (75 km/h) | 1,002 hPa (29.59 inHg) | Northwestern Mexico# | —N/a | Minimal | |
| Boris | June 3–4, 2014 | 18 | 45 mph (75 km/h) | 999 hPa (29.50 inHg) | Southwestern Mexico, Guatemala | 6 | $54.1 million | |
| Douglas | June 30–July 5, 2014 | 126 | 50 mph (85 km/h) | 999 hPa (29.50 inHg) | None | —N/a | —N/a | |
| Elida | June 30–July 1, 2014 | 42 | 50 mph (85 km/h) | 1,002 hPa (29.59 inHg) | Western Mexico | —N/a | Unknown | |
| Fausto | July 7–8, 2014 | 30 | 45 mph (75 km/h) | 1,004 hPa (29.65 inHg) | None | —N/a | —N/a | |
| Wali | July 17–18, 2014 | 24 | 45 mph (75 km/h) | 1,003 hPa (29.62 inHg) | None | —N/a | —N/a | |
| Trudy | October 17–18, 2014 | 30 | 65 mph (100 km/h) | 998 hPa (29.47 inHg) | Southwestern Mexico# | 9 | >$12.3 million | |
| Ela | July 8–9, 2015 | 36 | 45 mph (75 km/h) | 1,002 hPa (29.59 inHg) | None | —N/a | —N/a | |
| Halola | July 11–12, 2015 | 48 | 60 mph (95 km/h)‡ | 998 hPa (29.47 inHg) | None | —N/a | —N/a | |
| Iune | July 11–12, 2015 | 24 | 40 mph (65 km/h) | 1,004 hPa (29.65 inHg) | None | —N/a | —N/a | |
| Enrique | July 13–17, 2015 | 102 | 50 mph (85 km/h) | 1,000 hPa (29.53 inHg) | None | —N/a | —N/a | |
| Felicia | July 23, 2015 | 12 | 40 mph (65 km/h) | 1,004 hPa (29.65 inHg) | None | —N/a | —N/a | |
| Kevin | September 1–5, 2015 | 84 | 60 mph (95 km/h) | 998 hPa (29.47 inHg) | Baja California Peninsula, Southwestern United States | —N/a | —N/a | |
| Malia | September 21–22, 2015 | 42 | 50 mph (85 km/h) | 992 hPa (29.29 inHg) | Hawaii | —N/a | —N/a | |
| Niala | September 25–28, 2015 | 78 | 65 mph (100 km/h) | 992 hPa (29.29 inHg) | Hawaii | —N/a | —N/a | |
| Nora | October 10–14, 2015 | 102 | 70 mph (110 km/h) | 993 hPa (29.32 inHg) | None | —N/a | —N/a | |
| Rick | November 19–22, 2015 | 66 | 40 mph (65 km/h) | 1,002 hPa (29.59 inHg) | None | —N/a | —N/a | |
| Agatha | July 2–4, 2016 | 48 | 50 mph (85 km/h) | 1,002 hPa (29.59 inHg) | None | —N/a | —N/a | |
| Estelle | July 16–21, 2016 | 144 | 70 mph (110 km/h) | 990 hPa (29.23 inHg) | None | —N/a | —N/a | |
| Howard | August 1–3, 2016 | 54 | 60 mph (95 km/h) | 998 hPa (29.47 inHg) | Hawaii | —N/a | —N/a | |
| Ivette | August 3–8, 2016 | 80 | 60 mph (95 km/h) | 1,000 hPa (29.53 inHg) | None | —N/a | —N/a | |
| Javier | August 7–9, 2016 | 54 | 65 mph (100 km/h) | 997 hPa (29.44 inHg) | Western Mexico, Northwestern Mexico, Baja California Peninsula# | —N/a | Minimal | |
| Kay | August 19–23, 2016 | 96 | 50 mph (85 km/h) | 1,000 hPa (29.53 inHg) | None | —N/a | —N/a | |
| Roslyn | September 26–28, 2016 | 72 | 50 mph (85 km/h) | 999 hPa (29.50 inHg) | None | —N/a | —N/a | |
| Tina | 13–14 November 2016 | 24 | 40 mph (65 km/h) | 1,004 hPa (29.65 inHg) | Western Mexico | —N/a | —N/a | |
| Otto | November 25–26, 2016 | 26.5 | 70 mph (110 km/h) | 993 hPa (29.32 inHg) | None (after crossover) | —N/a | —N/a | |
| Adrian | May 10, 2017 | 24 | 45 mph (75 km/h) | 1,004 hPa (29.65 inHg) | None | —N/a | —N/a | |
| Beatriz | June 1–2, 2017 | 24 | 45 mph (75 km/h) | 1,001 hPa (29.56 inHg) | Southwestern Mexico# | 7 | $10 million | |
| Calvin | June 12–13, 2017 | 12 | 45 mph (75 km/h) | 1,004 hPa (29.65 inHg) | Southwestern Mexico, Guatemala# | —N/a | $3.88 million | |
| Greg | July 18–25, 2017 | 180 | 60 mph (95 km/h) | 1,000 hPa (29.53 inHg) | None | —N/a | —N/a | |
| Jova | August 11–12, 2017 | 24 | 40 mph (65 km/h) | 1,003 hPa (29.62 inHg) | Western Mexico | —N/a | —N/a | |
| Lidia | August 30–September 2, 2017 | 78 | 65 mph (100 km/h) | 986 hPa (29.12 inHg) | Western Mexico, Baja California Peninsula, Arizona, California# | 20 | $36.1 million | |
| Pilar | September 23–25, 2017 | 42 | 50 mph (85 km/h) | 1,000 hPa (29.53 inHg) | Western Mexico | —N/a | Minimal | |
| Ramon | October 4, 2017 | 18 | 45 mph (75 km/h) | 1,002 hPa (29.59 inHg) | Southern Mexico | —N/a | —N/a | |
| Selma | October 27–28, 2017 | 30 | 40 mph (65 km/h) | 1,004 hPa (29.65 inHg) | Nicaragua, Costa Rica, El Salvador, Guatemala, Honduras# | 17 | Unknown | |
| Carlotta | June 15–17, 2018 | 48 | 65 mph (100 km/h) | 997 hPa (29.44 inHg) | Southwestern Mexico | 3 | Unknown | |
| Daniel | June 24–25, 2018 | 30 | 45 mph (75 km/h) | 1,004 hPa (29.65 inHg) | None | —N/a | —N/a | |
| Emilia | June 27–30, 2018 | 48 | 60 mph (95 km/h) | 997 hPa (29.44 inHg) | None | —N/a | —N/a | |
| Gilma | July 26–27, 2018 | 24 | 45 mph (75 km/h) | 1,005 hPa (29.68 inHg) | None | —N/a | —N/a | |
| Ileana | August 5–7, 2018 | 48 | 65 mph (100 km/h) | 998 hPa (29.47 inHg) | Western Mexico, Baja California Sur | 8 | ≥$737 thousand | |
| Kristy | August 7–11, 2018 | 114 | 70 mph (110 km/h) | 991 hPa (29.26 inHg) | None | —N/a | —N/a | |
| Paul | September 9–11, 2018 | 54 | 45 mph (75 km/h) | 1,002 hPa (29.59 inHg) | None | —N/a | —N/a | |
| Tara | October 15–16, 2018 | 42 | 65 mph (100 km/h) | 995 hPa (29.38 inHg) | Southwestern Mexico | —N/a | Minimal | |
| Vicente | October 19–23, 2018 | 84 | 50 mph (85 km/h) | 1,002 hPa (29.59 inHg) | Honduras, El Salvador, Guatemala, Southwestern Mexico# | 16 | $7.05 million | |
| Xavier | November 3–6, 2018 | 72 | 65 mph (100 km/h) | 995 hPa (29.38 inHg) | Southwestern Mexico | —N/a | —N/a | |
| Cosme | July 6–7, 2019 | 36 | 50 mph (85 km/h) | 1,001 hPa (29.56 inHg) | None | —N/a | —N/a | |
| Dalila | July 23–24, 2019 | 24 | 40 mph (65 km/h) | 1,005 hPa (29.68 inHg) | Panama, Costa Rica, Nicaragua | —N/a | —N/a | |
| Gil | August 3–4, 2019 | 12 | 40 mph (65 km/h) | 1,006 hPa (29.71 inHg) | None | —N/a | —N/a | |
| Henriette | August 12–13, 2019 | 24 | 45 mph (75 km/h) | 1,003 hPa (29.62 inHg) | None | —N/a | —N/a | |
| Ivo | August 21–24, 2019 | 78 | 70 mph (110 km/h) | 990 hPa (29.23 inHg) | Clarion Island | —N/a | —N/a | |
| Akoni | September 5–6, 2019 | 24 | 45 mph (75 km/h) | 1,003 hPa (29.62 inHg) | None | —N/a | —N/a | |
| Mario | September 18–23, 2019 | 120 | 70 mph (110 km/h) | 991 hPa (29.26 inHg) | None | —N/a | —N/a | |
| Narda | September 29-October 1, 2019 | 54 | 50 mph (85 km/h) | 997 hPa (29.44 inHg) | None | —N/a | —N/a | |
| Ema | October 12–14, 2019 | 42 | 50 mph (85 km/h) | 1,003 hPa (29.62 inHg) | None | —N/a | —N/a | |
| Octave | October 18–19, 2019 | 42 | 45 mph (75 km/h) | 1,006 hPa (29.71 inHg) | None | —N/a | —N/a | |
| Priscilla | October 20–21, 2019 | 24 | 45 mph (75 km/h) | 1,003 hPa (29.62 inHg) | None | —N/a | —N/a | |
| Raymond | November 15–18, 2019 | 54 | 50 mph (85 km/h) | 1,001 hPa (29.56 inHg) | Southern California, Arizona | —N/a | Minimal | |
Overall reference for name, dates, duration, winds and pressure:

=== 2020–present ===
| Name | Dates as a tropical storm | Duration (hours) | Sustained wind speeds | Pressure | Areas affected | Deaths | Damage (USD) | Refs |
|---|---|---|---|---|---|---|---|---|
| Amanda | May 31, 2020 | 4 | 40 mph (65 km/h) | 1,003 hPa (29.62 inHg) | Guatemala, El Salvador, Honduras, Mexico | 40 | $250 million | |
| Boris | July 24–25, 2020 | 12 | 40 mph (65 km/h) | 1,005 hPa (29.68 inHg) | None | —N/a | —N/a | |
| Cristina | July 7–12, 2020 | 132 | 70 mph (110 km/h) | 993 hPa (29.32 inHg) | None | —N/a | —N/a | |
| Fausto | August 16–17, 2020 | 12 | 40 mph (65 km/h) | 1,004 hPa (29.65 inHg) | California | —N/a | —N/a | |
| Hernan | August 26–28, 2020 | 54 | 45 mph (75 km/h) | 1,001 hPa (29.56 inHg) | Southwest Mexico, Baja California Peninsula | 1 | Unknown | |
| Iselle | August 26–30, 2020 | 84 | 60 mph (95 km/h) | 997 hPa (29.44 inHg) | Clarion Island | —N/a | —N/a | |
| Julio | September 5–7, 2020 | 48 | 45 mph (75 km/h) | 1,004 hPa (29.65 inHg) | Southwest Mexico | —N/a | —N/a | |
| Karina | September 13–16, 2020 | 84 | 60 mph (95 km/h) | 996 hPa (29.41 inHg) | None | —N/a | —N/a | |
| Lowell | September 21–25, 2020 | 96 | 50 mph (85 km/h) | 1,001 hPa (29.56 inHg) | None | —N/a | —N/a | |
| Norbert | October 5–8, 14, 2020 | 72 | 60 mph (95 km/h) | 1,000 hPa (29.53 inHg) | Socorro Island | —N/a | —N/a | |
| Odalys | November 3–5, 2020 | 48 | 50 mph (85 km/h) | 1,000 hPa (29.53 inHg) | None | —N/a | —N/a | |
| Polo | November 17–19, 2020 | 42 | 45 mph (75 km/h) | 1,004 hPa (29.65 inHg) | None | —N/a | —N/a | |
| Andres | May 9–10, 2021 | 24 | 40 mph (65 km/h) | 1,005 hPa (29.68 inHg) | Southwestern Mexico | —N/a | —N/a | |
| Blanca | May 30–June 2, 2021 | 42 | 60 mph (95 km/h) | 998 hPa (29.47 inHg) | None | —N/a | —N/a | |
| Carlos | June 12–14, 2021 | 36 | 50 mph (85 km/h) | 1,000 hPa (29.53 inHg) | None | —N/a | —N/a | |
| Dolores | June 18–19, 2021 | 30 | 70 mph (110 km/h) | 990 hPa (29.23 inHg) | Southwestern Mexico, Western Mexico | 3 | $50 million | |
| Guillermo | July 17–19, 2021 | 54 | 60 mph (95 km/h) | 999 hPa (29.50 inHg) | Revillagigedo Islands | —N/a | —N/a | |
| Jimena | August 5–6, 2021 | 30 | 40 mph (65 km/h) | 1,005 hPa (29.68 inHg) | None | —N/a | —N/a | |
| Ignacio | August 1–2, 2021 | 12 | 40 mph (65 km/h) | 1,004 hPa (29.65 inHg) | Revillagigedo Islands | —N/a | —N/a | |
| Kevin | August 7–11, 2021 | 102 | 60 mph (95 km/h) | 999 hPa (29.50 inHg) | Revillagigedo Islands | —N/a | —N/a | |
| Marty | August 23–24, 2021 | 24 | 45 mph (75 km/h) | 1,000 hPa (29.53 inHg) | None | —N/a | —N/a | |
| Terry | November 7–10, 2021 | 19 | 40 mph (65 km/h) | 1,006 hPa (29.71 inHg) | Panama, Costa Rica | None | Minimal | |
| Sandra | November 7–9, 2021 | 24 | 40 mph (65 km/h) | 1,005 hPa (29.68 inHg) | None | None | None | |
| Celia | June 17–28, 2022† | 174 | 65 mph (100 km/h) | 993 hPa (29.32 inHg) | Central America | 1 | Unknown | |
| Georgette | July 27–31, 2022 | 96 | 60 mph (95 km/h) | 997 hPa (29.44 inHg) | None | None | None | |
| Ivette | August 15, 2022 | 12 | 40 mph (65 km/h) | 1,005 hPa (29.68 inHg) | Clarion Island | None | None | |
| Javier | September 1–4, 2022 | 48 | 50 mph (85 km/h) | 999 hPa (29.50 inHg) | Revillagigedo Islands, Baja California Sur | Unknown | None | |
| Lester | September 16–17, 2022 | 36 | 45 mph (75 km/h) | 1,002 hPa (29.59 inHg) | Southwestern Mexico | Unknown | 1 | |
| Madeline | September 17–20, 2022 | 60 | 65 mph (100 km/h) | 992 hPa (29.29 inHg) | Southwestern Mexico | Unknown | 3 | |
| Newton | September 21–25, 2022 | 66 | 65 mph (100 km/h) | 996 hPa (29.41 inHg) | Southwestern Mexico | Unknown | None | |
| Paine | October 3–5, 2022 | 42 | 45 mph (75 km/h) | 1,004 hPa (29.65 inHg) | None | None | None | |
| Julia | October 9–10, 2022 | 24 | 45 mph (75 km/h) | 993 hPa (29.32 inHg) | Central America, Southwestern Mexico | Unknown | None | |
| Eugene | August 5–7, 2023 | | 70 mph (110 km/h) | 992 hPa (29.29 inHg) | None | None | None | |
| Greg | August 14–17, 2023 | | 50 mph (85 km/h) | 1,000 hPa (29.53 inHg) | None | None | None | |
| Irwin | August 27–29, 2023 | | 40 mph (65 km/h) | 997 hPa (29.44 inHg) | None | None | None | |
| Kenneth | September 19–22, 2023 | | 50 mph (85 km/h) | 1,000 hPa (29.53 inHg) | None | None | None | |
| Max | October 8–10, 2023 | | 65 mph (100 km/h) | 991 hPa (29.26 inHg) | Southwestern Mexico, Gulf Coast of the United States | 2 | $10 million | |
| Pilar | October 30– November 5, 2023 | | 60 mph (95 km/h) | 996 hPa (29.41 inHg) | El Salvador, Honduras, Nicaragua | 4 | $45 million | |
| Ramon | November 23–26, 2023 | | 45 mph (75 km/h) | 1,002 hPa (29.59 inHg) | None | None | None | |
| Aletta | July 4–5, 2024 | 18 | 40 mph (65 km/h) | 1,005 hPa (29.68 inHg) | None | None | None | |
| Aletta | July 24–26, 2024 | | 60 mph (95 km/h) | 1,001 hPa (29.56 inHg) | None | None | None | |
| Daniel | August 3–5, 2024 | | 40 mph (65 km/h) | 1,005 hPa (29.68 inHg) | None | None | None | |
| Emilia | August 4–8, 2024 | | 70 mph (110 km/h) | 988 hPa (29.18 inHg) | None | None | None | |
| Fabio | August 5–7, 2024 | | 65 mph (100 km/h) | 996 hPa (29.41 inHg) | None | None | None | |
| Hector | August 25–28, 2024 | | 60 mph (95 km/h) | 998 hPa (29.47 inHg) | None | None | None | |
| Ileana | September 12–15, 2024 | | 50 mph (85 km/h) | 997 hPa (29.44 inHg) | Baja California Peninsula, Northwestern Mexico | Minimal | None | |
| Lane | November 1–3, 2024 | | 45 mph (75 km/h) | 1,004 hPa (29.65 inHg) | None | None | None | |
| Alvin | May 28–31, 2025 | | 60 mph (95 km/h) | 999 hPa (29.50 inHg) | El Salvador, Baja California Peninsula, Western Mexico | $986,000 | 5 | |
| Cosme | June 8- 11, 2025 | | 70 mph (110 km/h) | 991 hPa (29.26 inHg) | None | None | None | |
| Dalila | June 13-15, 2025 | | 65 mph (100 km/h) | 992 hPa (29.29 inHg) | Western Mexico | $39.4 million | 1 | |
| Keli | July 28-30, 2025 | | 50 mph (85 km/h) | 1003 hPa (29.61 inHg) | None | None | None | |
| Ivo | August 6-11, 2025 | | 65 mph (100 km/h) | 998 hPa (29.47 inHg) | Western Mexico, Revillagigedo Islands, Baja California peninsula | None | None | |
| Juliette | August 24-28, 2025 | | 70 mph (110 km/h) | 994 hPa (29.35 inHg) | Clarion Island, Southern California | None | None | |
| Mario | September 11-18, 2025 | | 65 mph (100 km/h) | 994 hPa | Southern Mexico, Southwestern Mexico, Revillagigedo Islands, Baja California peninsula, Southwestern United States | $40.7 million | 2 | |
| Raymond | October 9-11, 2025 | | 60 mph (95 km/h) | 998 hPa (29.47 inHg) | Northern Central America, Southwestern Mexico, Baja California peninsula | >$6.17 million | 6 | |
| Sonia | October 24-28, 2025 | | 50 mph (85 km/h) | 1001 hPa (29.55 inHg | None | None | None | |
Overall reference for name, dates, duration, winds and pressure:

== Landfalls ==
| Name | Year | Tropical storm | Tropical depression | Refs |
|---|---|---|---|---|
| Andres | 1997 | – | San Salvador, El Salvador (June 7) | |
| Olaf | 1997 | – | Oaxaca state (September 29), Colima state (October 12) | |
| Javier | 1998 | – | Jalisco state (September 14) | |
| Norman | 2000 | Michoacán state (September 20) | Sinaloa state (September 22) | |
| Rosa | 2000 | Oaxaca state (November 8) | – | |
| Julio | 2002 | Michoacán state (September 26) | – | |
| Carlos | 2003 | Oaxaca state (June 27) | – | |
| Barbara | 2007 | Chiapas state (June 2) | – | |
| Alma | 2008 | Leon, Nicaragua (May 29) | – | |
| Julio | 2008 | Baja California Sur state (August 25) | – | |
| Lowell | 2008 | Baja California Sur state (September 7) | – | |
| Agatha | 2010 | Champerico, Guatemala (May 30) | – | |
| Georgette | 2010 | Baja California Sur state (September 21) | Sonora state (September 22) | |
| Norman | 2012 | – | Sinaloa state (September 29) | |
| Juliette | 2013 | Baja California Sur state (August 29) | – | |
| Octave | 2013 | Baja California Sur state (October 15) | – | |
| Sonia | 2013 | Sonora state (November 4) | – | |
| Trudy | 2014 | Guerrero state (October 18) | – | |
| Javier | 2016 | Baja California Sur state (August 9) | – | |
| Beatriz | 2017 | Oaxaca state (June 2) | – | |
| Calvin | 2017 | Oaxaca state (June 13) | – | |
| Lidia | 2017 | Baja California Sur state (September 1 and 2) | – | |
| Selma | 2017 | Playa El Pimental, El Salvador (October 28) | – | |
| Vicente | 2018 | – | Michoacán state (October 23) | |
| Narda | 2019 | Michoacán and Jalisco states (September 29 and October 1) | – | |
| Priscilla | 2019 | Colima state (October 20) | – | |
| Amanda | 2020 | Guatemala (May 31) | – | |
| Dolores | 2021 | Colima/Michoacán (June 19) | – | |
| Julia | 2022 | El Salvador (October 10) | – | |
| Max | 2023 | Guerrero (October 9) | – | |

== See also ==
- List of Pacific hurricanes
- List of Pacific hurricane seasons

Additional information on tropical cyclone intensities

- Tropical cyclone intensity scales
- List of Atlantic tropical storms
- List of Category 1 Pacific hurricanes
- List of Category 2 Pacific hurricanes
- List of Category 3 Pacific hurricanes
- List of Category 4 Pacific hurricanes
- List of Category 5 Pacific hurricanes
