= List of Atlantic subtropical cyclones =

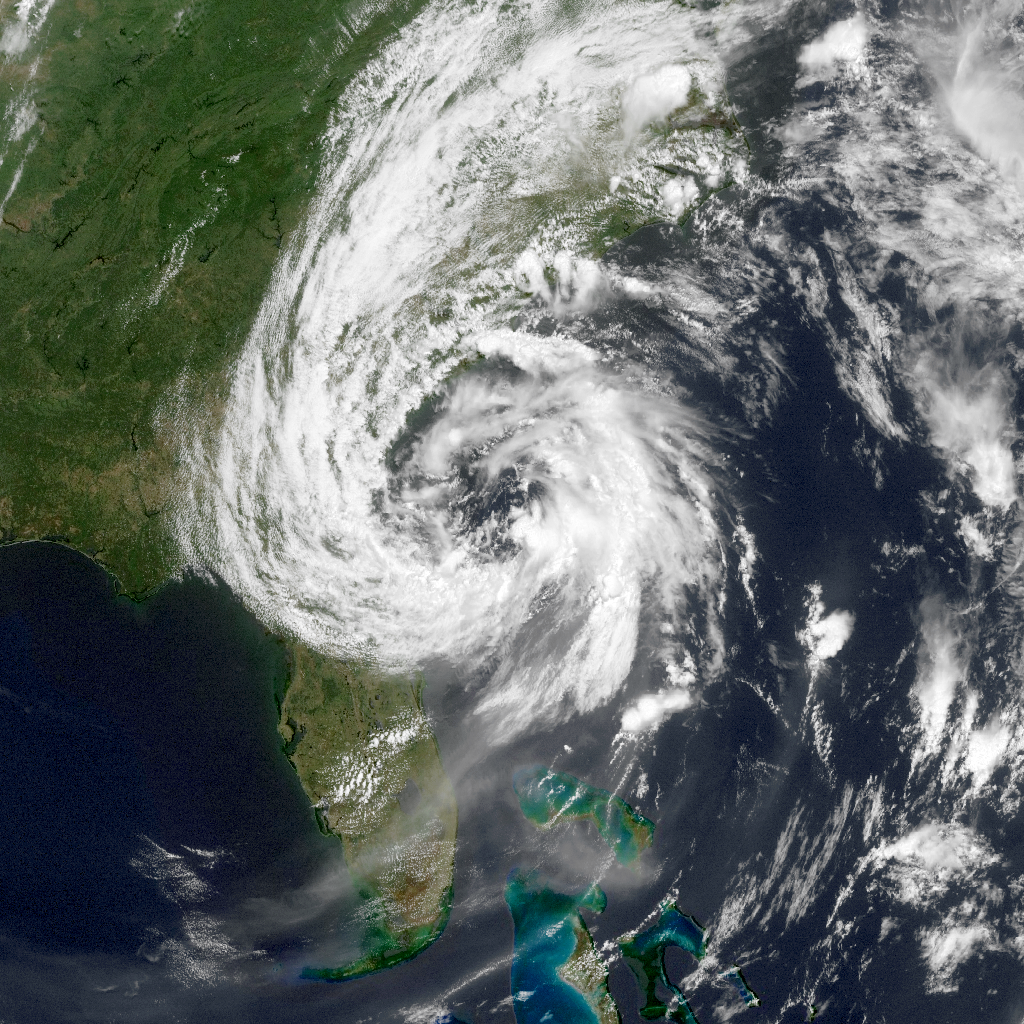
Satellite image of Subtropical Storm Andrea in May 2007 east of Florida, shortly after it was designated

A subtropical cyclone is a cyclone with winds equivalent to a tropical storm, but without all the characteristics of a tropical cyclone. Such storms are usually weak, short-lived, form at mid-latitudes, and rarely affect land.

In the Atlantic Ocean, subtropical storms often form, with an average rate of one per few seasons. Since they started being tracked in the 1960s, there have been 31 of them. Subtropical storms started being named as a part of the regular season in 2002, though they were briefly given names from a different list in the 1970s.

This list does not include any subtropical cyclones that became tropical storms or hurricanes.

== Systems ==
Name	Duration	Type	Peak intensity		Areas affected	Damage (USD)	Deaths	Refs
Name	Duration	Type	Wind speed	Pressure	Areas affected	Damage (USD)	Deaths	Refs
Unnamed	September 14 – 23, 1968	Subtropical Storm	85 mph (140 km/h)	976 hPa (28.82 inHg)	None	None	None	
One	September 29 – October 3, 1969	Subtropical Storm	60 mph (95 km/h)	995 hPa (29.38 inHg)	Florida	None	None	
Kristy	October 18 – 21, 1971	Subtropical Storm	70 mph (110 km/h)	992 hPa (29.29 inHg)	None	None	None	
Alpha	May 23 – 29, 1972	Subtropical Storm	70 mph (110 km/h)	991 hPa (29.26 inHg)	American Southeast	$100,000	2	
Four	July 11 – 13, 1972	Subtropical Storm	40 mph (65 km/h)	1014 hPa (29.94 inHg)	None	None	None	
Twelve	September 3 – 5, 1972	Subtropical Storm	50 mph (85 km/h)	1000 hPa (29.53 inHg)	None	None	None	
Charlie	September 19 – 21, 1972	Subtropical Storm	65 mph (105 km/h)	1001 hPa (29.56 inHg)	None	None	None	
Sixteen	September 29 – October 3, 1972	Subtropical Storm	40 mph (65 km/h)	1012 hPa (29.88 inHg)	None	None	None	
Delta	November 1 – 7, 1972	Subtropical Storm	45 mph (75 km/h)	1001 hPa (29.56 inHg)	None	None	None	
Unnumbered	April 25 – 26, 1973	Subtropical Depression	35 mph (55 km/h)	1006 hPa (29.71 inHg)	None	None	None	
Alfa	July 30 – August 2, 1973	Subtropical Storm	45 mph (75 km/h)	1005 hPa (29.68 inHg)	New England	None	None	
Thirteen	September 24 – 26, 1973	Subtropical Depression	35 mph (55 km/h)	1009 hPa (29.80 inHg)	Florida	None	None	
Three	August 12 – 15, 1974	Subtropical Storm	65 mph (100 km/h)	996 hPa (29.41 inHg)	None	None	None	
Four	October 5 – 7, 1974	Subtropical Storm	65 mph (100 km/h)	1003 hPa (29.62 inHg)	The Bahamas, Florida	$600,000	None	
Unnamed	October 18 – 20, 1974	Subtropical Storm	60 mph (95 km/h)	1012 hPa (29.88 inHg)	Azores	None	None	
24L	January 4 – 9, 1975	Subtropical Storm	65 mph (100 km/h)	1001 hPa (29.56 inHg)	None	None	None	
Two	December 9 – 13, 1975	Subtropical Storm	70 mph (110 km/h)	985 hPa (29.09 inHg)	None	None	None	
One	May 21 – 25, 1976	Subtropical Storm	50 mph (85 km/h)	994 hPa (29.35 inHg)	Florida	$628,000	None	
Three	September 13 – 17, 1976	Subtropical Storm	45 mph (75 km/h)	1011 hPa (29.85 inHg)	American Southeast	None	None	
One	January 18 – 23, 1978	Subtropical Storm	45 mph (75 km/h)	1002 hPa (29.59 inHg)	None	None	None	
One	October 23 – 25, 1979	Subtropical Storm	75 mph (120 km/h)	980 hPa (28.94 inHg)	Newfoundland	None	None	
Three	November 12 – 17, 1981	Subtropical Storm	70 mph (110 km/h)	978 hPa (28.88 inHg)	U.S. East Coast	None	None	
One	June 18 – 20, 1982	Subtropical Storm	70 mph (110 km/h)	984 hPa (29.06 inHg)	Florida, U.S. East Coast	$10 million	3	
One	August 18 – 21, 1984	Subtropical Storm	60 mph (95 km/h)	1000 hPa (29.53 inHg)	None	None	None	
One	April 21 – 24, 1992	Subtropical Storm	50 mph (85 km/h)	1002 hPa (29.59 inHg)	None	None	None	
Unnamed	June 1 – 2, 1997	Subtropical Storm	50 mph (85 km/h)	1003 hPa (29.62 inHg)	None	None	None	
Unnamed	October 25 – 29, 2000	Subtropical Storm	65 mph (100 km/h)	976 hPa (28.82 inHg)	New England, Atlantic Canada	None	None	
Nicole	October 10 – 11, 2004	Subtropical Storm	50 mph (85 km/h)	986 hPa (29.12 inHg)	Bermuda, Atlantic Canada, New England	None	None	
Unnamed	October 4 – 5, 2005	Subtropical Storm	50 mph (85 km/h)	997 hPa (29.44 inHg)	Azores	None	None	
Unnamed	October 8 – 10, 2005	Subtropical Depression	35 mph (55 km/h)	1008 hPa (29.77 inHg)	None	None	None	
Andrea	May 9 – 11, 2007	Subtropical Storm	60 mph (95 km/h)	1001 hPa (29.56 inHg)	Virginia, Southeastern U.S., Bahamas	Minimal	6	
Unnamed	December 5 – 7, 2013	Subtropical Storm	50 mph (85 km/h)	997 hPa (29.44 inHg)	Azores	None	None	
Andrea	May 20 – 21, 2019	Subtropical Storm	40 mph (65 km/h)	1006 hPa (29.71 inHg)	Bermuda	None	None	
Rebekah	October 30 – November 1, 2019	Subtropical Storm	50 mph (85 km/h)	983 hPa (29.03 inHg)	Azores	None	None	
Alpha	September 17 – 19, 2020	Subtropical Storm	50 mph (85 km/h)	996 hPa (29.41 inHg)	Portugal, Spain	$24.2 million	1	
Teresa	September 24 – 25, 2021	Subtropical Storm	45 mph (75 km/h)	1008 hPa (29.77 inHg)	Bermuda	None	None	
Unnamed	January 16 – 17, 2023	Subtropical Storm	70 mph (110 km/h)	976 hPa (28.82 inHg)	Nova Scotia	None	None	
Karen	October 9-10, 2025	Subtropical Storm	45 mph (75 km/h)	998 hPa (29.47 inHg)	None	None	None	
Josephine	October 21-October 22, 2026	Subtropical Storm	65 mph (100 km/h)	988 hPa (29.18 inHg)	Mid-Atlantic U.S.	None	None	

== Statistics ==
Subtropical storms by month
Month	Number of storms
January	3
February	0
March	0
April	1
May	6
June	3
July	2
August	2
September	7
October	10
November	2
December	2
