= 1974 hurricane season =

1974 hurricane season may refer to:

- The 1974 Atlantic hurricane season
- The 1974 Pacific hurricane season
