= Tropical Storm Alma (1974) =

Atlantic tropical storm in 1974

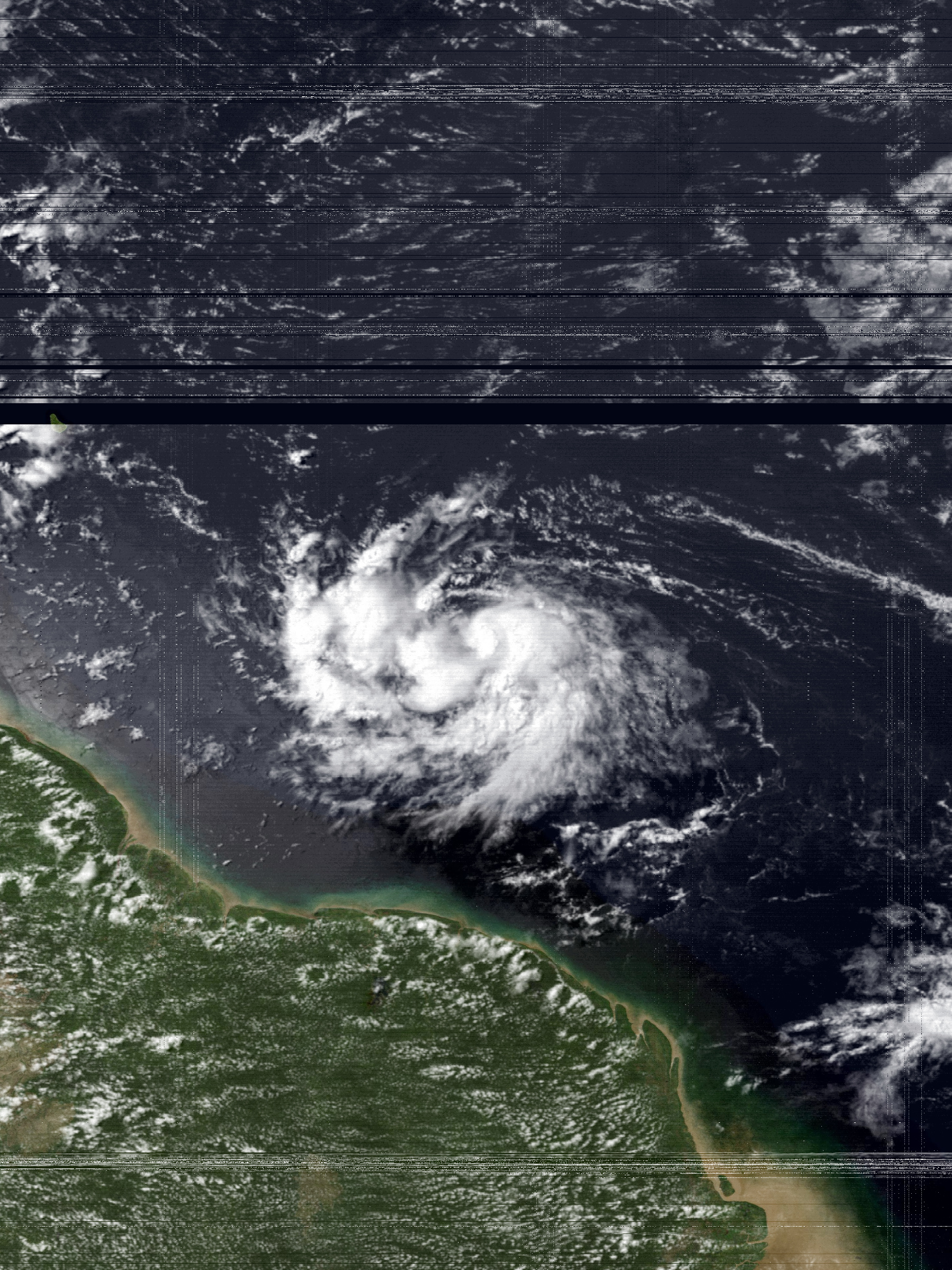
- Tropical Storm Alma at peak intensity on August 13

Meteorological history
- Formed: August 12, 1974
- Dissipated: August 15, 1974

Tropical storm
- 1-minute sustained (SSHWS/NWS)
- Highest winds: 65 mph (100 km/h)
- Lowest pressure: 1007 mbar (hPa); 29.74 inHg

Overall effects
- Fatalities: 51 total
- Damage: $5 million (1974 USD)
- Areas affected: Trinidad and Tobago, Venezuela
- IBTrACS
- Part of the 1974 Atlantic hurricane season

Tropical Storm Alma, the first named storm to develop in the 1974 Atlantic hurricane season, was a short lived tropical cyclone that made a rare Venezuelan landfall. The storm formed from the Intertropical Convergence Zone (ITCZ) on August 12 well to the east of the Windward Islands, but advisories were not issued until the next day when Alma was at peak intensity. Alma entered the southeastern Caribbean Sea at an unusually brisk westward pace of between 20 mph (32 km/h) to 25 mph (40 km/h), prompting numerous watches and gale warnings throughout the nations in this region. After crossing Trinidad, Alma became one of only four tropical storms to traverse the Paria Peninsula of northeastern Venezuela. The storm dissipated on August 15 over the high terrain of Venezuela.

Alma left heavy damage in Trinidad, amounting to about US$5 million (value in 1974), making it the most destructive cyclone of the 20th century on the island at that time. Alma damaged about 5,000 buildings, leaving 500 people homeless. The storm also wrecked 17,750 acres (7,180 ha) of crop fields. There were two deaths in Trinidad, including one person who was struck by flying debris. Alma's heavy rainfall was responsible for a plane crash on Isla Margarita off the Venezuelan coast, killing the 49 people on board.

== Meteorological history ==
Map plotting the storm's track and intensity, according to the Saffir–Simpson scale Map key Saffir–Simpson scale Tropical depression (≤38 mph, ≤62 km/h) Tropical storm (39–73 mph, 63–118 km/h) Category 1 (74–95 mph, 119–153 km/h) Category 2 (96–110 mph, 154–177 km/h) Category 3 (111–129 mph, 178–208 km/h) Category 4 (130–156 mph, 209–251 km/h) Category 5 (≥157 mph, ≥252 km/h) Unknown Storm type Tropical cyclone Subtropical cyclone Extratropical cyclone, remnant low, tropical disturbance, or monsoon depression

A disturbance associated with the Intertropical Convergence Zone (ITCZ) left the coast of West Africa on August 9, producing mid-level winds of 75 mph (120 km/h) in Dakar, Senegal. A weak circulation formed near the sea surface on August 10 within an area of thunderstorms. The disturbance moved slowly westward over the Atlantic Ocean, developing into a tropical depression at 18:00 UTC on August 12, around the 10th parallel north, an unusually southern latitude the cyclone would remain around throughout its lifetime. On August 13, the depression intensified into Tropical Storm Alma about 375 mi (605 km) east of Trinidad and Tobago, as indicated by a Hurricane Hunters flight reporting winds of 65 mph (105 km/h). This same flight observed a circular eye with a diameter of 36 mi (58 km), the only report of an eye-like structure from this storm.

The center of Alma was elongated, causing gale-force winds to extend 75 mi (120 km) to the north while extending only 25 miles (40 km) to the south. On August 14 the Hurricane Hunters measured gusts of 80 mph (130 km/h); however, the storm's overall wind pattern weakened after its initial peak. Alma continued westward at 23 mph (37 km/h), which National Hurricane Center (NHC) Director Neil Frank noted was unusually rapid for a tropical cyclone at this time and location. Alma was able to maintain its low latitude westward movement due to a strong subtropical ridge to its north, which was at an unseasonably low latitude for the month of August.

On August 14, Alma made landfall on Trinidad with winds of 55 mph (90 km/h), the southernmost landfall on that island since a storm in 1933. Even though the storm traversed Trinidad in only three hours, its time over land was sufficient to disrupt the circulation. The storm crossed the Gulf of Paria and made its second and final landfall on the Paria Peninsula of Venezuela, one of only four storms on record to do so; the others were in 1605, 1725, and 1933. The high mountains in Venezuela took a toll on the storm, ripping the circulation and causing Alma to be downgraded to a tropical depression on August 15. At 02:00 UTC that day, Alma's circulation passed near Caracas. The convection rapidly diminished, and the storm's presence on satellite imagery faded, though the NHC noted the potential for redevelopment once it reached open waters. The storm did not survive its trek over land; late on August 15, the NHC issued the final advisory after the circulation dissipated near the border of Venezuela and Colombia. The remnants of Alma continued westward across South and Central America, reaching the Pacific Ocean where they would eventually restrengthen into Hurricane Joyce.

== Preparations, impact, and aftermath ==
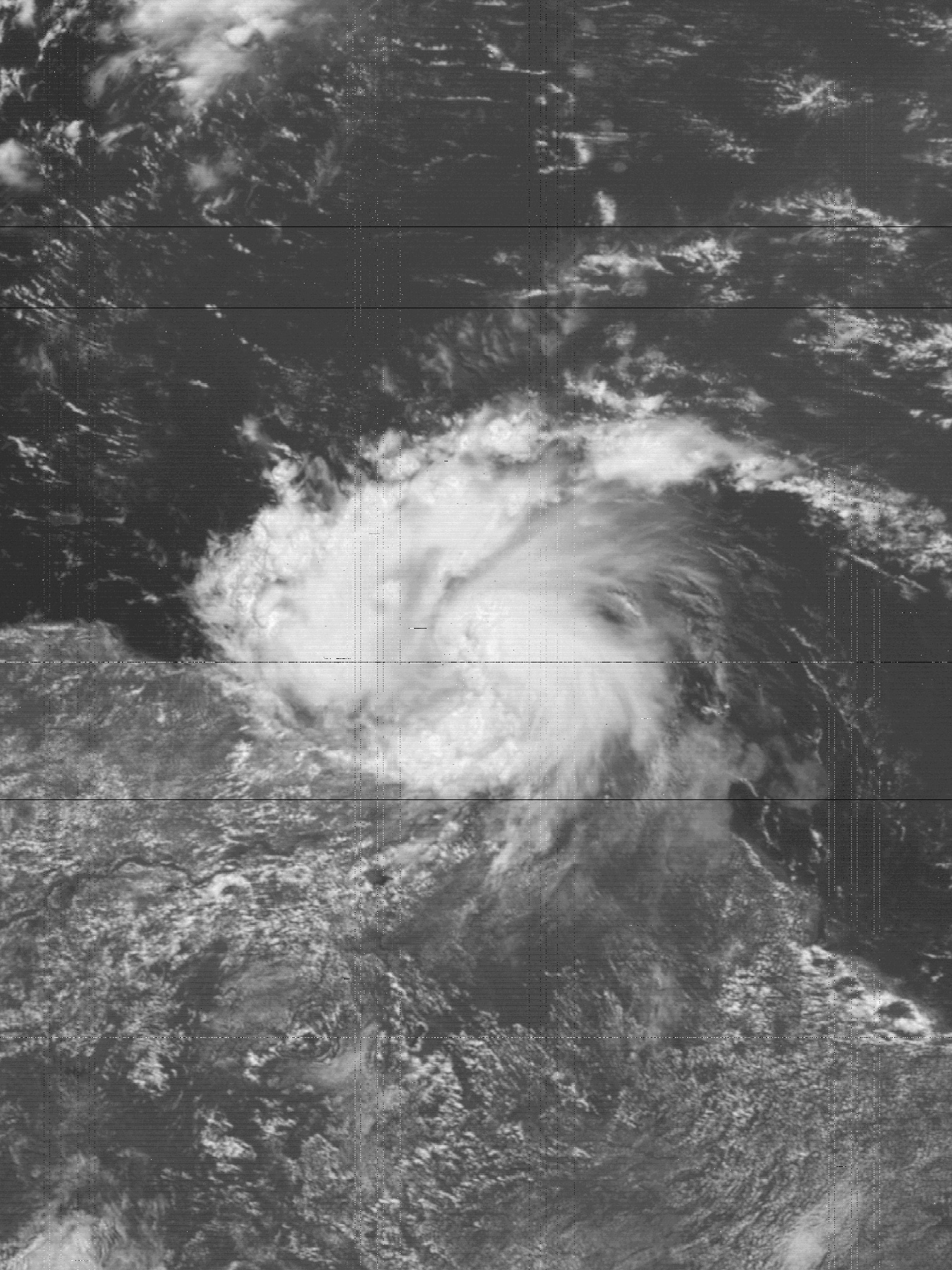
Tropical Storm Alma over Trinidad on August 14

Before Alma made landfall, gale warnings and a hurricane watch was issued for Trinidad, Tobago, Grenada, Saint Vincent and the Grenadines, and Barbados. As Alma progressed westward, gale warnings were also issued for the Paria and Paraguaná peninsulas of Venezuela, the Guajira Peninsula, and the ABC islands. Initially, the Trinidad and Tobago weather service anticipated Alma would strike Tobago, but as the storm approached, the trajectory over Trinidad became apparent.

While moving across Trinidad, Alma produced sustained winds of only 35 mph (56 km/h) at Piarco, yet gusts reached 91 mph (147 km/h) at Savonetta. Rainfall at Piarco did not exceed 1 inch (25 mm) during the storm's passage. The strong gusts downed trees and power lines, and damaged about 5,000 buildings, including schools, hospitals, and hundreds of households, wrecking everything inside. This left about 500 people homeless. Alma also caused widespread damage to agriculture, mostly to sugar, resulting in 17,750 acres (7,180 ha) of ruined fields. Several highways in the country suffered damage. The winds flung debris from a roof, which struck and killed a woman. There was also an indirect death on the island, along with several injuries. Damage estimates on the island totaled $5 million (1974 USD); the American embassy in the country considered Alma to be the most destructive storm in Trinidad during the 20th century.

After the storm, local Red Cross volunteers provided meals and clothing to thousands of storm victims. The government allocated $5.1 million (Trinidad and Tobago dollars) for relief work, to be coordinated by the National Emergency Relief Organization of Trinidad and Tobago, which was established following the damaging Hurricane Flora in 1963. This helped rebuild damage houses, clear roads, and assist affected farmers. The United States Agency for International Development sent about US$5,000 in assistance, after the country's ambassador sent a formal request to Washington, D.C. The Amoco oil company also sent a $500 donation to the country's Red Cross.

While moving through the Windward Islands, Alma produced strong wind gusts on Grenada. The outer rainbands of Alma spread over Venezuela while the center was still over Trinidad. At about 13:00 UTC on August 14, the rains caused a Linea Aeropostal Venezolana Vickers Viscount 749 turboprop airliner circling the airport on Isla Margarita to crash. The aircraft struck the side of La Gloria, 26 ft (8 m) below the summit. All but one of the 49 people aboard died on impact; the co-pilot survived for 17 more days before dying from irreversible brain damage. Elsewhere in Venezuela, Alma's heavy rainfall triggered several landslides.

== See also ==
- Tropical Storm Alma (disambiguation) - other storms of the same name
- 1933 Trinidad hurricane - Early-season hurricane that moved across Trinidad and northeastern Venezuela
- Tropical Storm Bret (1993) - Another low-latitude tropical storm that made landfall on Venezuela
- Hurricane Joyce (2000) - Low-latitude hurricane that passed between Trinidad and Tobago
- Tropical Storm Bret (2017) - Similar storm that hit Trinidad in mid June 2017
