= List of storms named Alma =

The name Alma has been used to name eleven tropical cyclones worldwide: five in the Atlantic Ocean, five in the East Pacific Ocean, and one in the West Pacific Ocean.

In the Atlantic:

- Tropical Storm Alma (1958) – made landfall in northeastern Mexico
- Hurricane Alma (1962) – struck North Carolina as a tropical storm before heading out to sea
- Hurricane Alma (1966) – a Category 3 hurricane that traversed Cuba and then made landfall near Apalachee Bay, Florida; killed 90, mostly in Honduras, and did $210 million damage (in 1966 dollars), mostly to Cuba
- Hurricane Alma (1970) – made landfall as a depression near Cedar Key, Florida
- Tropical Storm Alma (1974) – made landfall in Venezuela, caused 47 indirect deaths from a plane crash on Isla Margarita

In the East Pacific:

- Tropical Storm Alma (1984) – never affected land
- Hurricane Alma (1990) – earliest Pacific hurricane on record, but never affected land
- Hurricane Alma (1996) – affected Mexico with heavy rainfall, causing at least three deaths
- Hurricane Alma (2002) – early season major hurricane that never affected land
- Tropical Storm Alma (2008) – made landfall on the Pacific coast of Nicaragua

The name Alma was retired after the 2008 season and replaced with Amanda.

In the West Pacific:

- Typhoon Alma (1946) – approached Japan
