= Subtropical Storm Four =

Atlantic subtropical storm in 1974

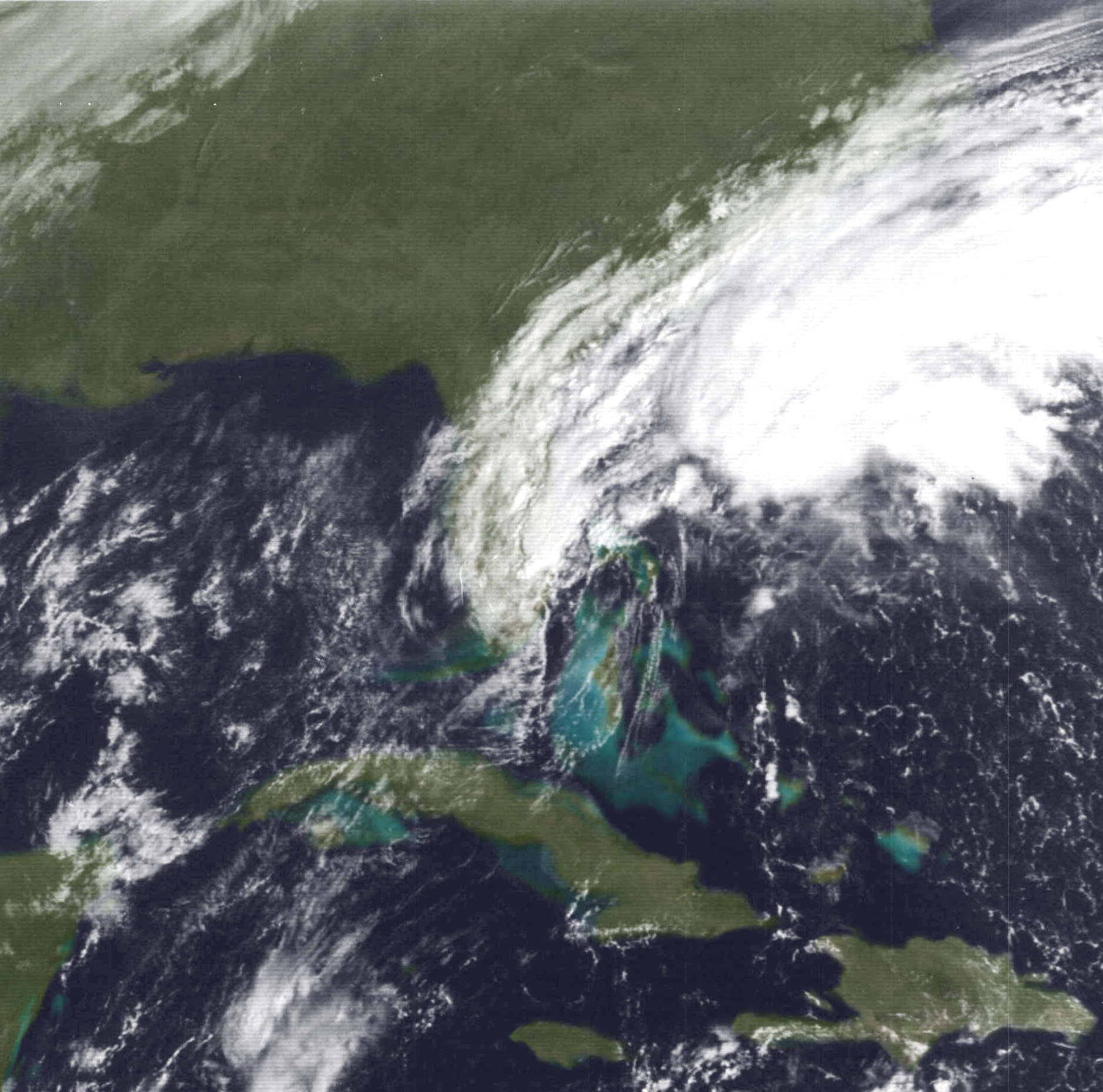
- Subtropical Storm Four brushing the eastern coast of Florida on October 6, 1974

Meteorological history
- Formed: October 4, 1974
- Dissipated: October 8, 1974

Subtropical storm
- 1-minute sustained (SSHWS/NWS)
- Highest winds: 50 mph (85 km/h)
- Lowest pressure: 1006 mbar (hPa); 29.71 inHg

Overall effects
- Fatalities: 0
- Damage: ≥$600,000 (1974 USD)
- Areas affected: The Bahamas, Florida, Georgia, South Carolina, North Carolina, Bermuda
- Part of the 1974 Atlantic hurricane season

Subtropical Storm Four brushed Florida and The Bahamas in October 1974. The fifteenth cyclone and second subtropical storm of the 1974 Atlantic hurricane season, the storm developed near eastern Cuba on October 4 from an area of disturbed weather. Shortly before striking Andros Island on October 6, the system strengthened into a subtropical storm. The storm made its closest approach to Florida early on October 7. Peaking with sustained winds of 50 mph (85 km/h), the system veered northward and then northeastward, but nonetheless caused heavy rainfall and coastal flooding on land in Florida. While paralleling offshore North Carolina and South Carolina, the storm began to slowly weaken. By late on October 8, the subtropical cyclone merged with a cold front while well east of Cape Hatteras.

Gale-force winds were observed by ships and land stations in The Bahamas. The storm and a stationary high pressure system over the Eastern United States resulted in strong winds and rough seas along the coast of Florida for several days, especially on October 6. Many coastal areas observed sustained winds of 25 to 40 mph (40 to 64 km/h), with higher gusts. The storm also produced isolated pockets of heavy rainfall, including 14 in (360 mm) of precipitation in Boca Raton. Dozens of homes were flooded in Boca Raton and Pompano Beach. The heavy rainfall destroyed about 50% of winter vegetable crops in Broward County and about 25% of the eggplant crop and about 5%–10% of other crops in Palm Beach County. The storm also brought rainfall and abnormally high tides to Georgia, South Carolina, North Carolina, and Bermuda. Damage totaled at least $600,000 (1974 USD).

== Meteorological history ==
Map plotting the storm's track and intensity, according to the Saffir–Simpson scale Map key Saffir–Simpson scale Tropical depression (≤38 mph, ≤62 km/h) Tropical storm (39–73 mph, 63–118 km/h) Category 1 (74–95 mph, 119–153 km/h) Category 2 (96–110 mph, 154–177 km/h) Category 3 (111–129 mph, 178–208 km/h) Category 4 (130–156 mph, 209–251 km/h) Category 5 (≥157 mph, ≥252 km/h) Unknown Storm type Tropical cyclone Subtropical cyclone Extratropical cyclone, remnant low, tropical disturbance, or monsoon depression

A quasi-stationary cold front moved southeastward toward Cuba on October 3. Shortly thereafter, a low pressure area developed along its axis. At 00:00 UTC on October 4, Subtropical Depression Four developed offshore eastern Cuba. It then drifted north-northwestward and intensified slowly. Due to a large high pressure area, the cold front, and the subtropical cyclone, gale-force winds began spreading into the eastern Gulf of Mexico, the Straits of Florida, and adjacent land areas. At 16:00 UTC on October 5, the National Hurricane Center stated that a low pressure center developed in the central Bahamas, though it was not classified as a subtropical cyclone. Late on October 5, ships crossing through the central Bahamas reported gale-force winds.

The system intensified into a subtropical storm at 00:00 UTC on October 6. Shortly thereafter, the subtropical storm struck Andros Island in The Bahamas with winds of 45 mph (75 km/h). The storm approached Florida and passed about 15 mi (24 km) east of West Palm Beach, Florida on October 7. Around that time, the system peaked with maximum sustained winds of 50 mph (85 km/h). Thereafter, the cyclone slowly weakened as it veered northeastward and avoided landfall in Florida. As it was paralleling offshore of the Carolinas between October 7 and October 8, ships continued to report gale-force winds. By late on October 8, the system merged with a cold front while located about 405 mi (650 km) east of Cape Hatteras, North Carolina. The remnants accelerated northeastward and became unidentifiable north of Bermuda on October 9.

== Impact ==
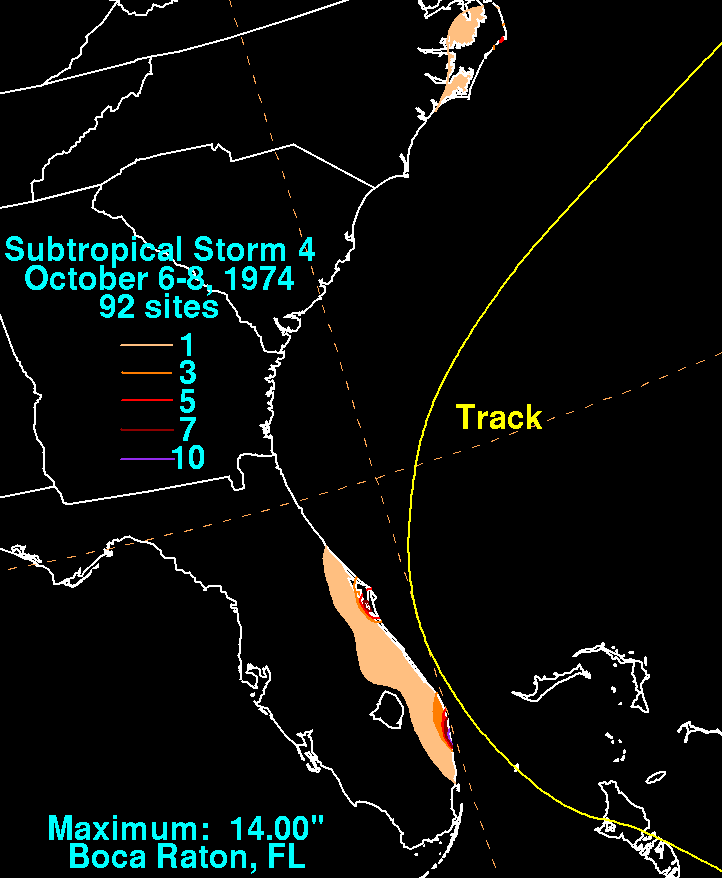
Rainfall totals associated with the subtropical storm in the United States

During the storm's early stages, several ships and land stations in the Bahamas observed gale-force winds. A strong, persistent high pressure system became stationary over the Eastern United States while the subtropical storm was developing over The Bahamas. This meteorological pattern resulted in very rough seas and strong winds over Florida for several days, especially when the subtropical storm made its closest approach on October 6. As a result, gale warnings were issued from the Jupiter Inlet northward to Savannah, Georgia, beginning at 21:00 UTC on October 6, as were small craft warnings around the entire Florida peninsula and northward to Virginia Beach, Virginia.

Along the east coast of Florida, several weather stations reported sustained winds between 25 and 40 mph (40 and 64 km/h), with gusts exceeding 40 mph (64 km/h) at some locations. Tides generally were about 3 ft (0.91 m) above normal, leaving widespread erosion and threatening several oceanfront structures. Many coastal streets were closed due to either sand deposited on the roads or tidal flooding. Isolated areas also observed heavy rainfall. Precipitation peaked at 14 in (360 mm) in Boca Raton, while other areas such as Deerfield Beach and Cocoa reported 11.5 in (290 mm) and 10 in (250 mm) of rainfall, respectively.

Waves left 1 ft (0.30 m) of water on State Road A1A in Hollywood, resulting in about 1.5 mi (2.4 km) of the road being closed. Dozens of homes were flooded in Pompano Beach. Along the beach, nearly 20 ft (6.1 m) of sand was lost in one section. State Road A1A was closed from 14th Street northward, while North Federal Highway was shut down between 9th Street and 15th Street. Deerfield Beach generally lost about 3 to 4 ft (0.91 to 1.22 m) of its shore due to erosion. Throughout Broward County, about 50% of winter vegetable crops were destroyed due to 6 to 8 in (150 to 200 mm) of rainfall in the northern part of the county. Sporadic losses of electricity occurred throughout the county due to falling tree limbs, but most outages were quickly restored.

In Boca Raton, 5,000 homes were left without electricity and 2,500 homes lost telephone service at the height of the storm. Washouts occurred on two Interstate 95 overpasses. More than 100 cars were flooded. Floodwaters entered a few businesses along Dixie Highway, while firemen received 21 calls to pump water out of homes. Damage to city properties ranged from about $10,000–$15,000, while damage throughout the city may have reached approximately $500,000. The storm caused approximately $100,000 in beach erosion damage in Delray Beach. In Lake Worth, 10 to 12 ft (3.0 to 3.7 m) waves were observed along the shore, causing erosion south of the municipal pier. Abnormally high tides in West Palm Beach caused a brief closure of Flagler Drive between Monroe Drive and Southern Boulevard. Sporadic power outages were reported in the city due to falling tree limbs. In Palm Beach, minor coastal flooding occurred on South Ocean Boulevard. Throughout Palm Beach County, about 25% of the eggplant crop was destroyed, while about 5%–10% of pepper, squash, and tomato plants were lost.

At the north end of Jupiter Island, waves severely damaged at least three homes. Many condominiums along Beach Road lost electricity after tree limbs fell on the wires. In Indian River County, some beaches lost several feet of sand. Erosion caused part of a restaurant in Vero Beach to collapse. In Cape Canaveral, the shoreline was mostly protected by more than 7,000 sandbags, which had been filled by 500–600 volunteers. One house partially collapsed due to erosion. Severe erosion occurred in the vicinity of Ponce de Leon Inlet, with waves reaching the top of the sand dunes and above the seawalls at Daytona Beach Shores. In Port Orange, waves from the Halifax River caused left about 1 ft (0.30 m) of standing water on parts of Riverside Drive. The storm produced wind gusts near 40 mph (64 km/h) in the Daytona Beach area. Throughout Florida, the storm caused at least $600,000 in damage.

In Georgia, tides 6.4 ft (2.0 m) above mean low water and 2.8 ft (0.85 m) above normal was reported at Fort Pulaski. Tides in South Carolina ranged from 1 to 2 ft (0.30 to 0.61 m) above normal, causing minor erosion. The storm also produced rainfall in eastern North Carolina, with the highest observed total being 5.35 inches (136 mm) in Cape Hatteras. Additionally, light rainfall was reported on Bermuda, peaking at 1.75 inches (44 mm).

== See also ==
- List of Florida hurricanes (1950–1974)
- Subtropical Storm One (1974)
- Tropical Storm Isidore (1984)
