= 1974 Atlantic hurricane season =

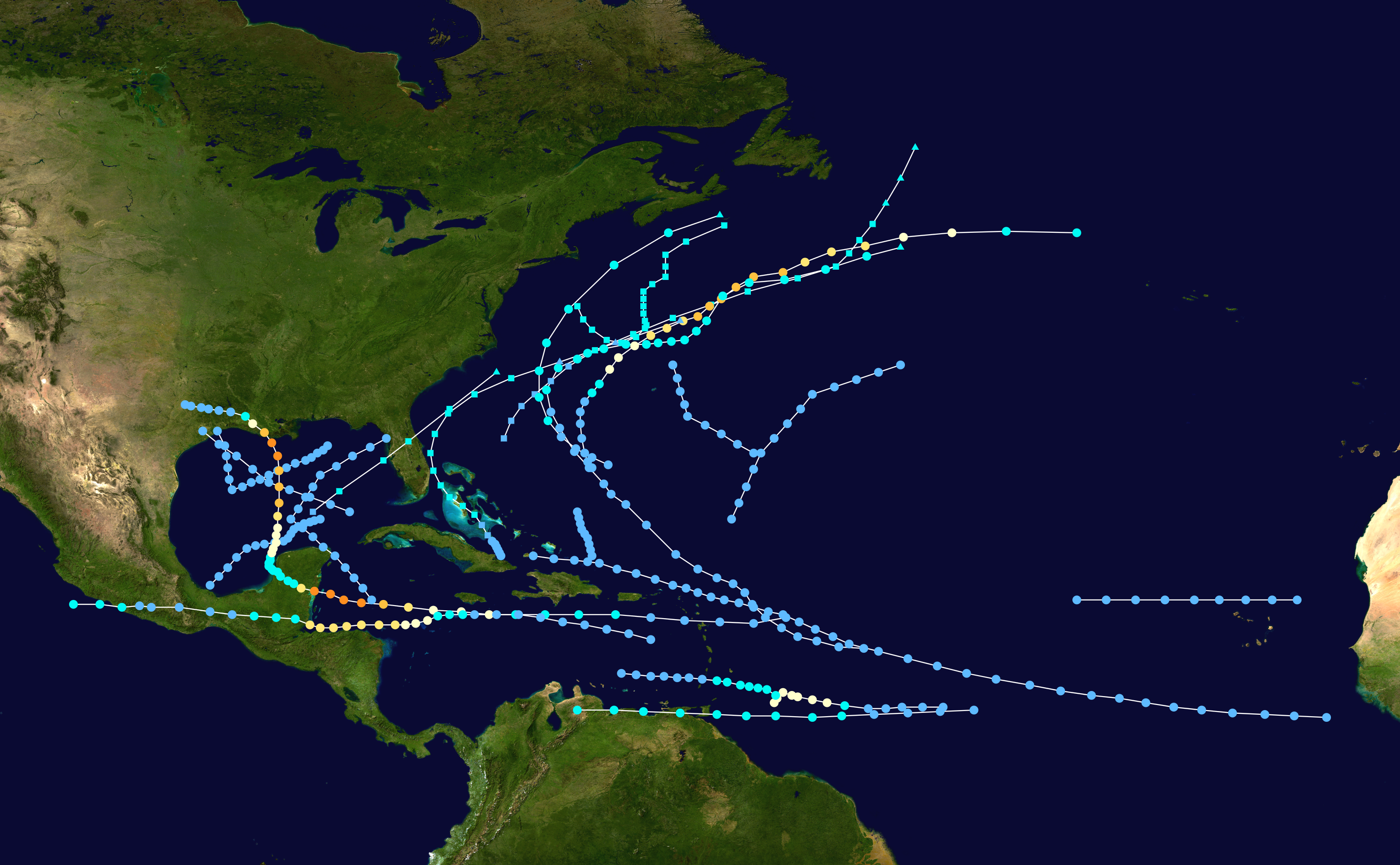
- Season summary map

Seasonal boundaries
- First system formed: June 22, 1974
- Last system dissipated: October 21, 1974

Strongest storm
- Name: Carmen
  - Maximum winds: 155 mph (250 km/h) (1-minute sustained)
  - Lowest pressure: 928 mbar (hPa; 27.4 inHg)

Seasonal statistics
- Total depressions: 16
- Total storms: 12
- Hurricanes: 4
- Major hurricanes (Cat. 3+): 2
- Total fatalities: 8,277 total (Third-deadliest Atlantic hurricane season)
- Total damage: $2 billion (1974 USD)

Related articles
- 1974 Pacific hurricane season; 1974 Pacific typhoon season; 1974 North Indian Ocean cyclone season

The 1974 Atlantic hurricane season was a destructive and deadly hurricane season. In terms of overall activity, it was average, with twelve nameable storms forming, of which four became hurricanes. Two of the four became major hurricanes, which are Category 3 or higher systems on the Saffir–Simpson scale. The season officially began on June 1 and lasted until November 30. These dates conventionally delimit the period of each year when most tropical cyclones form in the Atlantic Ocean.

The first system, an unnamed tropical storm, developed over the Bay of Campeche on June 22 and dissipated by June 26. The most intense storm of the season was Hurricane Carmen, which struck the Yucatán Peninsula at Category 4 intensity and Louisiana at Category 3 intensity. Carmen caused about $162 million in damage, mostly in Louisiana, and 12 deaths. Also highly notable was Hurricane Fifi, the deadliest Atlantic hurricane since the 1900 Galveston hurricane, which dropped torrential rain in Central America, especially Honduras. The hurricane left more than $1.8 billion in damage and at least 8,210 fatalities. In August, poor weather conditions produced by Tropical Storm Alma caused a plane crash in Venezuela, which killed 49 people. Alma caused two additional deaths in Trinidad. Collectively, the tropical cyclones of this year resulted in at least 8,277 deaths and just under $2 billion in damage.

== Season summary ==
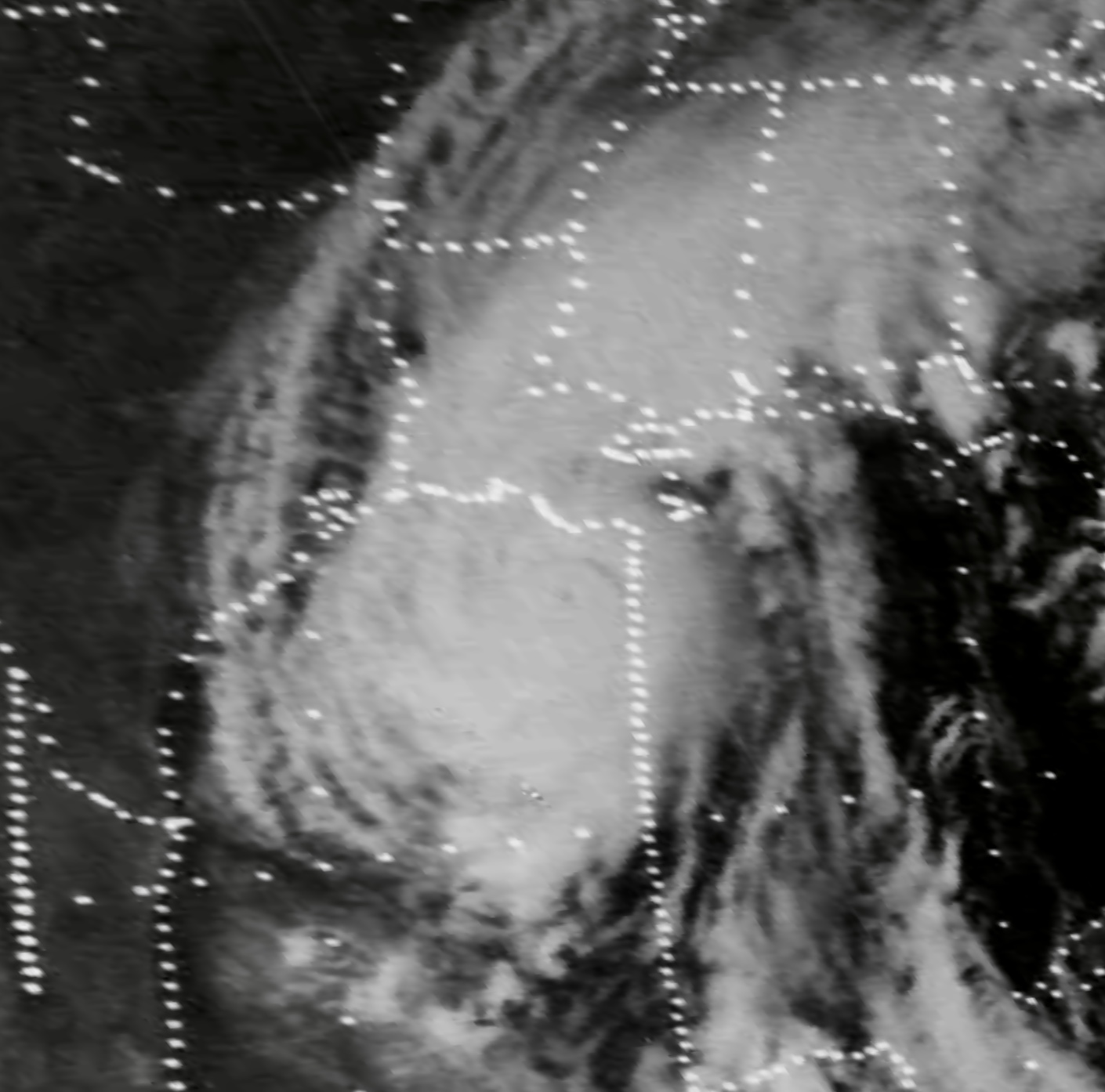
Satellite imagery of Hurricane Carmen approaching the Gulf Coast of the United States

The hurricane season officially began on June 1, with the first tropical cyclone developing on June 22. A total of 16 tropical and subtropical cyclones formed, with 12 of them intensifying into nameable storm systems. This was above the 1950–2000 average of 9.6 named storms. Four of these reached hurricane status, below the 1950–2000 average of 5.9. Furthermore, two storms reached major hurricane status; near the 1950–2000 average of 2.3. Collectively, the cyclones of this season caused at least 8,277 deaths and just under $2 billion in damage. The Atlantic hurricane season officially ended on November 30, with the final cyclone becoming an extratropical cyclone on October 20.

Similar to the previous two seasons, much of the tropics were dominated by extensive upper-level westerlies and colder than normal sea surface temperatures, producing unfavorable conditions, though to a lesser extent than in 1972 and 1973. Wind shear generated by the westerlies covered a smaller area, while sea surface temperatures in the tropics were generally above the threshold for tropical cyclogenesis. All named storms developed in regions with ocean temperatures exceeding 80 °F (27 °C).

Tropical cyclogenesis began in June, with an unnamed tropical storm developing over the Bay of Campeche on June 22. Two cyclones formed in July – an unnamed tropical storm followed by a tropical depression. August featured five systems, including Alma, Becky, Carmen, a subtropical storm, and a tropical depression. September was slightly more active, with Dolly, Elaine, Fifi, Gertrude, and two tropical depressions forming. Subtropical Storm Four and an unnumbered subtropical storm developed in October. The unnumbered subtropical storm would be the season's final system, when it transitioned into an extratropical cyclone on October 20.

The season's activity was reflected with an accumulated cyclone energy (ACE) rating of 71. ACE is a metric used to express the energy used by a tropical cyclone during its lifetime. Therefore, a storm with a longer duration will have high values of ACE. It is only calculated at six-hour increments in which specific tropical and subtropical systems are either at or above sustained wind speeds of 39 mph (63 km/h), which is the threshold for tropical storm intensity.

== Systems ==
=== Unnamed June tropical storm ===
- Tropical storm (SSHWS)
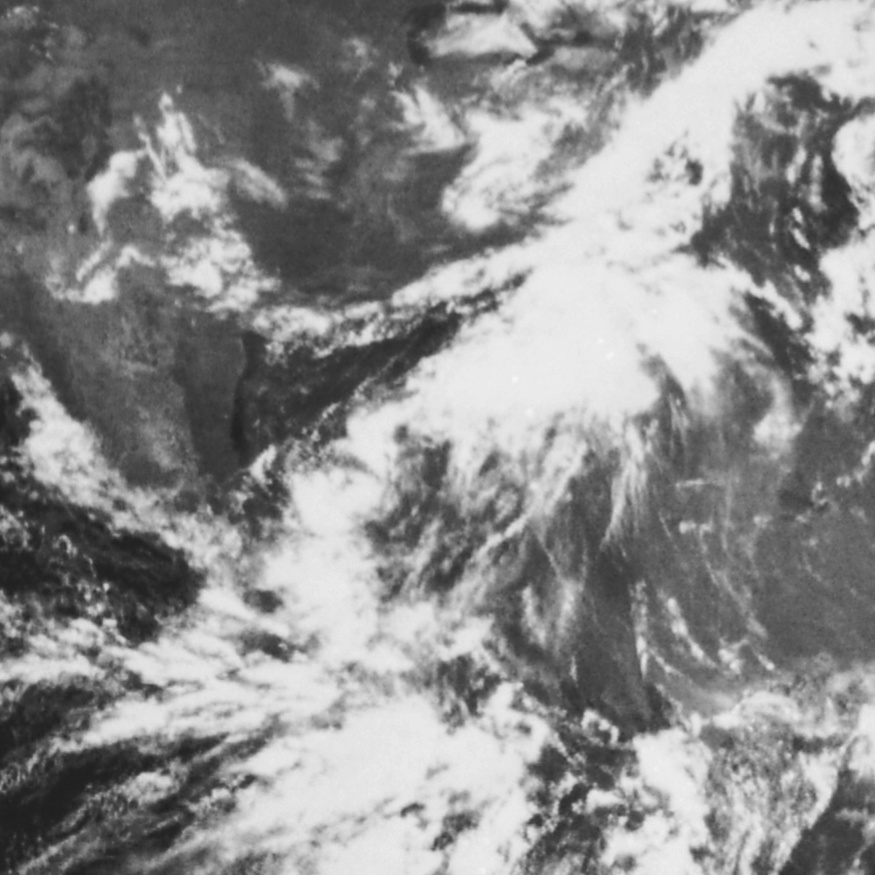
- Duration: June 22 – June 26
- Peak intensity: 50 mph (85 km/h) (1-min); 997 mbar (hPa)

A low-pressure formed over the Bay of Campeche near Veracruz by June 1. Although a reconnaissance aircraft flight failed to locate a closed circulation early on June 22, surface observations in Mexico showed evidence of a circulation later that day. A tropical depression was estimated to have formed at 12:00 UTC on June 22 while situated just offshore Montepío, Veracruz. Initially, the depression moved northeastward and appeared well-organized. However, by the following day, convection associated with the depression began weakening after an upper low pressure trough intensified over the eastern United States. Convection flared over the eastern Gulf of Mexico, but a second circulation had developed by June 24, with that system formerly listed as a subtropical storm; however, reanalysis removed it from HURDAT in 2026.

The depression, now moving slowly northeastward, redeveloped well-organized convection by June 25. However, shortly thereafter, the depression began to lose tropical characteristics due to interaction with atmospheric trough of low pressure. By June 26, the depression completed its extratropical transition over the eastern Gulf of Mexico. The remnants of the depression accelerated to the northeast and moved across Florida, before moving along the East Coast of the United States and then dissipating over New England by June 30. The remnants of the depression brought mostly light rainfall to East Coast states, but prtions of Florida experienced heavy precipitation, particularly the Tampa Bay area. A peak rainfall total of 11.38 in (289 mm) was observed at the St. Pete–Clearwater International Airport. Farther inland, Avon Park measured 7.2 in (180 mm). The storm brought flooding and erosion to parts of west Central Florida. Overall, approximately $24.8 million in damage occurred in Florida, with roughly half of that total incurred to beaches, bridges, drainage systems, roads, sewers, and utilities. Three deaths were reported in the state, all due to drowning.

=== Unnamed July tropical storm ===
- Tropical storm (SSHWS)
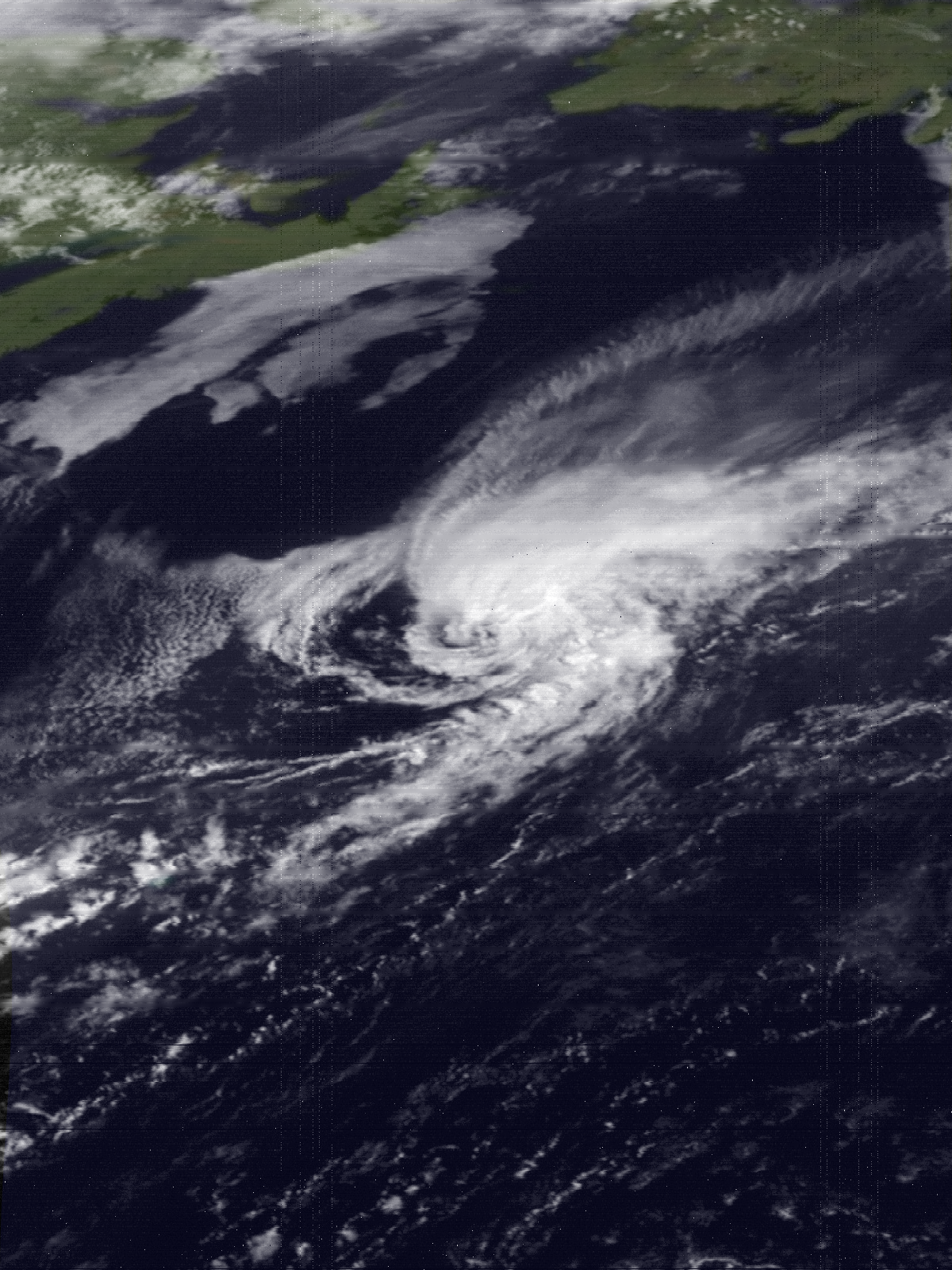
- Duration: July 14 – July 19
- Peak intensity: 60 mph (95 km/h) (1-min); 1007 mbar (hPa)

A convective area of cloudiness existed northeast of the Bahamas in mid July in response to a stationary frontal boundary. On July 15, satellite imagery suggested the presence of a weak circulation within the system. Around 00:00 UTC on the following day, a subtropical depression formed about 210 mi (340 km) northeast of the Bahamas. Moving northeastward, the cyclone slowly strengthened, becoming a subtropical storm at about 12:00 UTC on July 17. Late on the next day, the ship Export Adventurer observed winds of 54 mph (87 km/h) and a barometric pressure of 1,006 mbar (29.7 inHg). Based on these observations, the storm peaked with maximum sustained winds of 50 mph (85 km/h) on July 18. By the next day, the cyclone began weakening. Around 00:00 UTC on July 20, the subtropical storm was absorbed a large extratropical low, which dissipated well east of Newfoundland several hours later.

=== Subtropical Storm Three ===
- Subtropical storm (SSHWS)
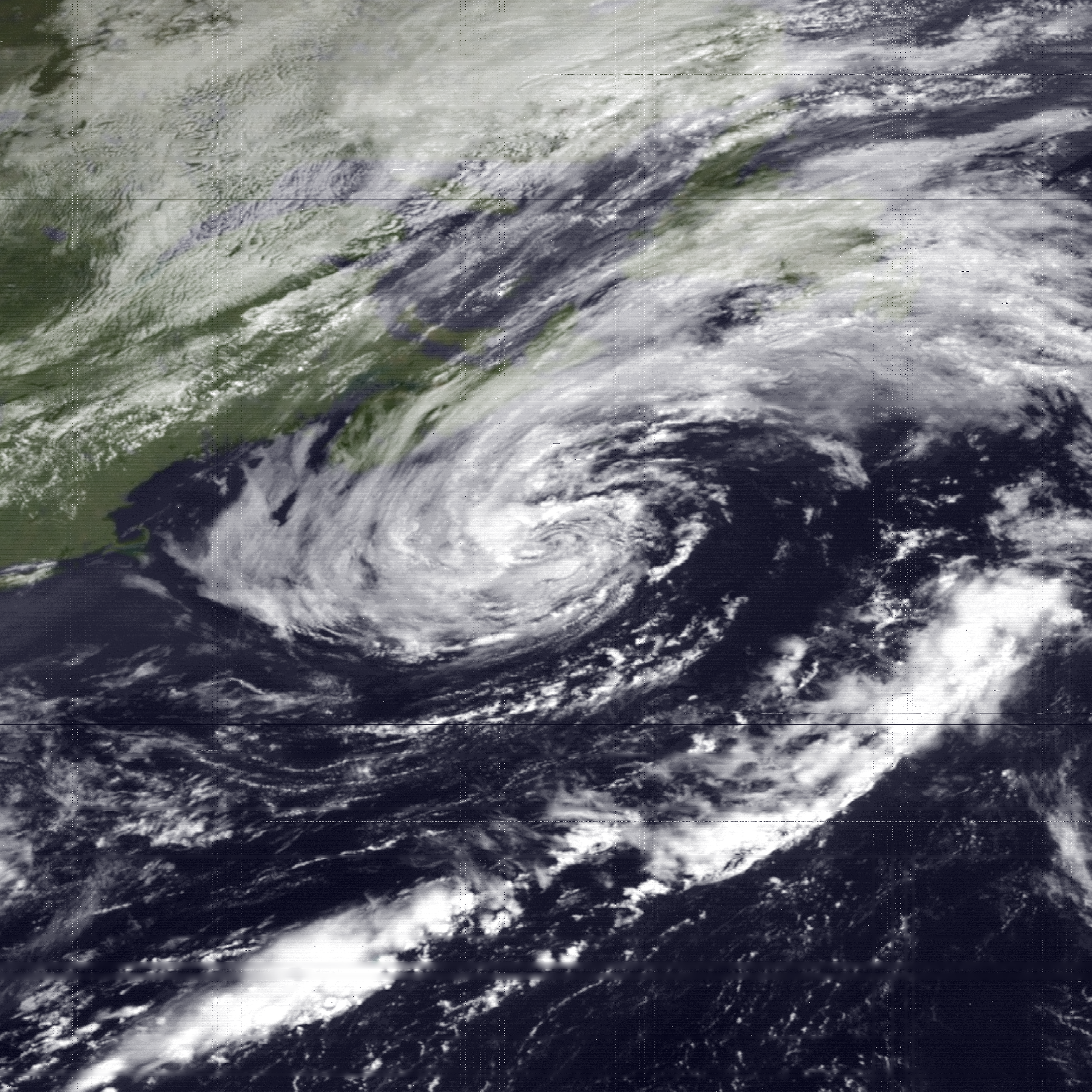
- Duration: August 12 – August 15
- Peak intensity: 65 mph (100 km/h) (1-min); 996 mbar (hPa)

A frontal wave formed along a stationary front which ended from near Cape Hatteras northeastward. At 12:00 UTC on August 10, a subtropical storm developed between Bermuda and New England. The storm moved southeastward and then northeastward, before turning northward early on August 12. Drifting northward, the cyclone continued to intensify. Around 12:00 UTC on August 14, the system peaked with maximum sustained winds of 65 mph (100 km/h) and a minimum barometric pressure of 996 mbar (29.4 inHg), based on ship observations. Later that day, the cyclone curved east-northeastward and accelerated, while its circulation became increasingly ill-defined, resembling that of a front, near Sable Island at about 00:00 UTC on August 15. The remnants of the storm were last noted passing over Cape Race several hours later.

=== Tropical Storm Alma ===
- Tropical storm (SSHWS)
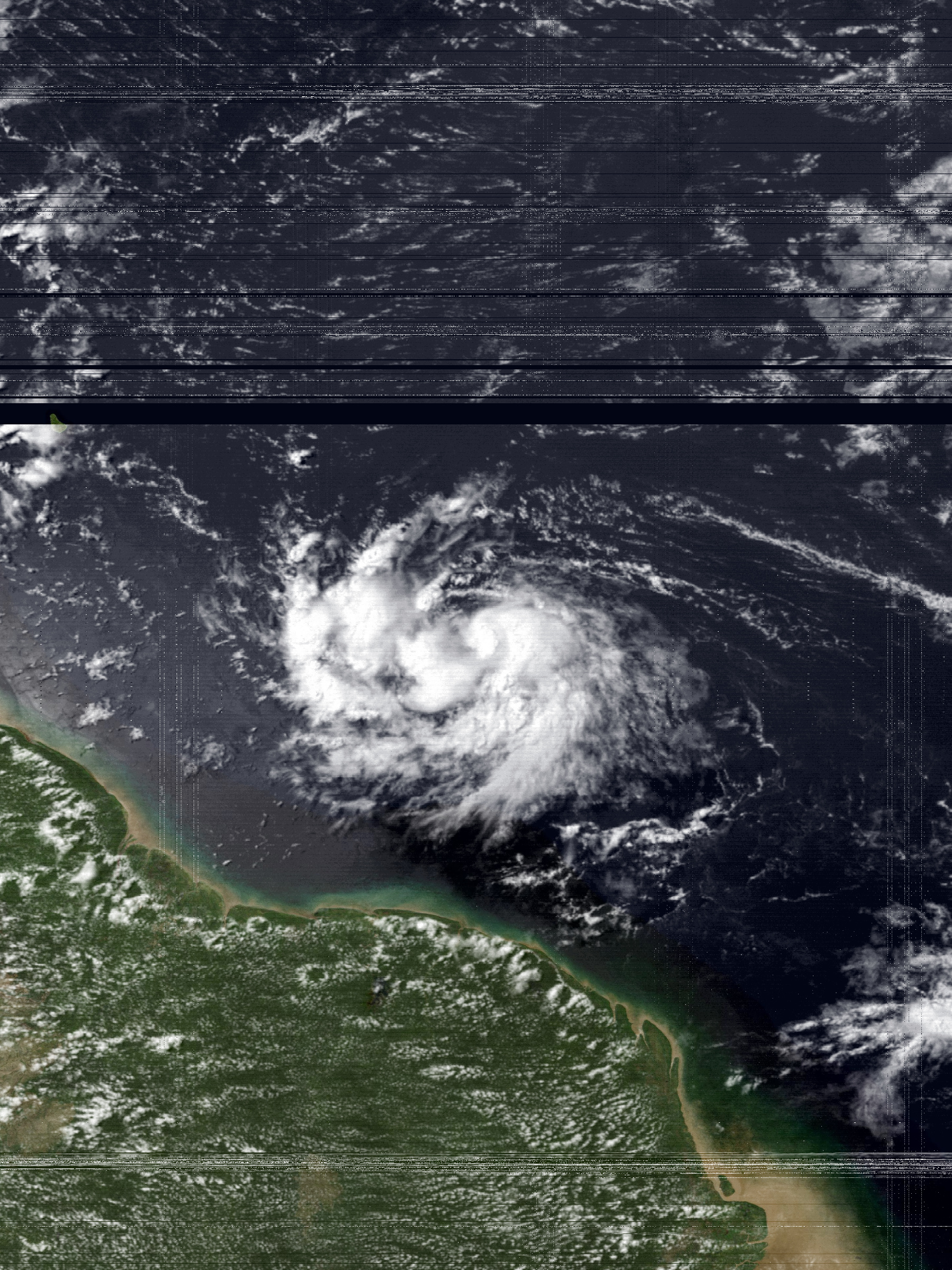
- Duration: August 12 – August 15
- Peak intensity: 60 mph (95 km/h) (1-min); ≤1007 mbar (hPa)

A vigorous tropical wave emerged off the western coast of Africa on August 9, developing into a tropical depression by 12:00 UTC on August 12 while located about 545 mi (875 km) east-southeast of Barbados. Steered rapidly west by an abnormally strong subtropical ridge, the depression intensified into Tropical Storm Alma by noon UTC the next day. Six hours later, Alma attained peak winds of 65 mph (100 km/h) in accordance with data from a reconnaissance aircraft. Early on August 14, Alma made landfall in Trinidad as a minimal tropical storm, becoming the southernmost-landfalling system on the island in 41 years. The system's circulation approached the coast of Venezuela and interacted with mountainous terrain, where it dissipated by 06:00 UTC on August 15.

The storm produced a wind gust as high as 91 mph (146 km/h) on Trinidad at Savonetta. Alma left heavy damage in Trinidad, amounting to approximately $5 million, making it the most destructive cyclone of the 20th century on the island at that time. The storm damaged about 5,000 buildings, leaving roughly 500 people homeless. Additionally, the cyclone ruined about 17,750 acres (7,180 ha) of crop fields. Two fatalities occurred in Trinidad, including one person who was struck by flying debris. Alma's heavy rainfall was responsible for a plane crash on Isla Margarita off the Venezuelan coast, killing the 49 people on board.

=== Tropical Depression Five ===
- Tropical depression (SSHWS)
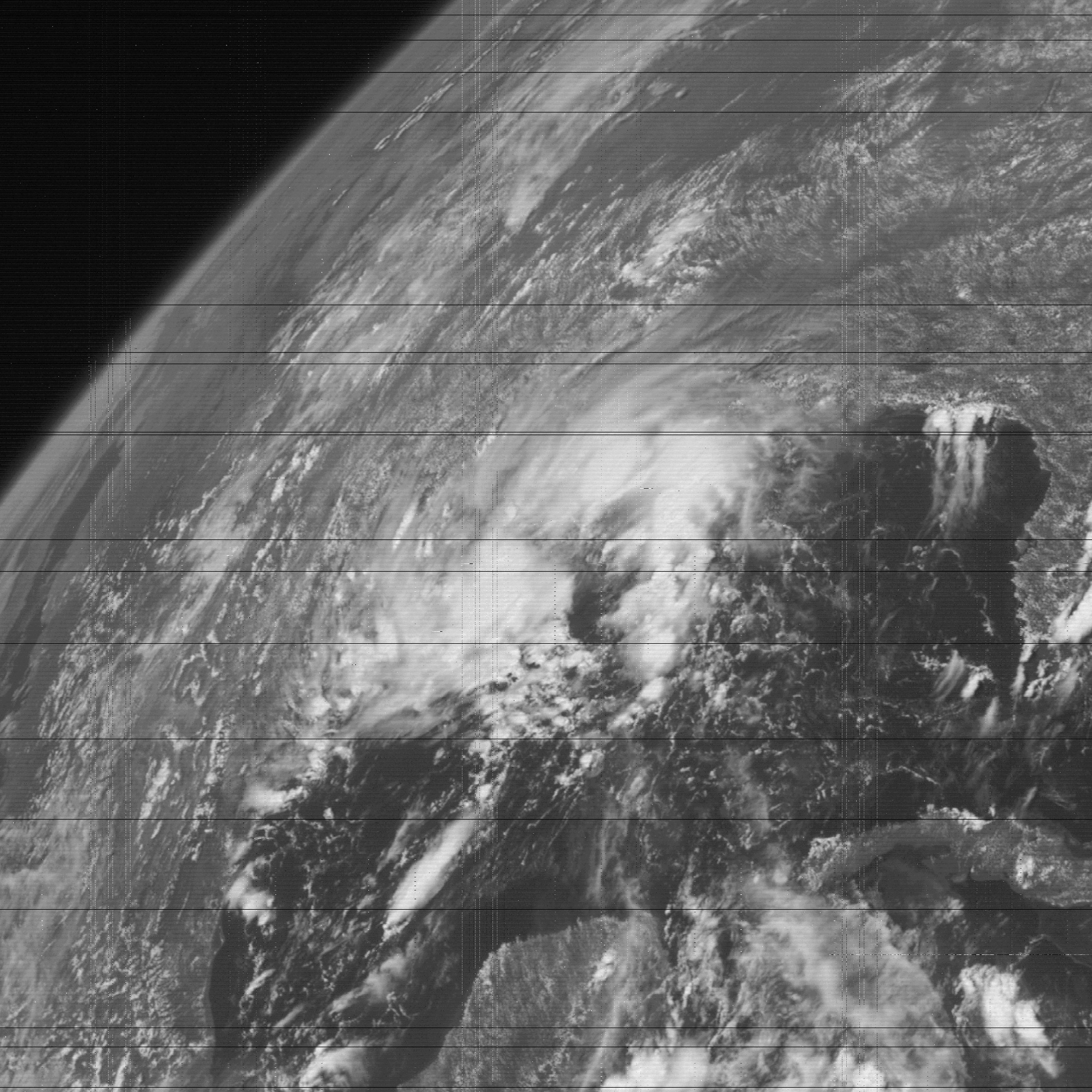
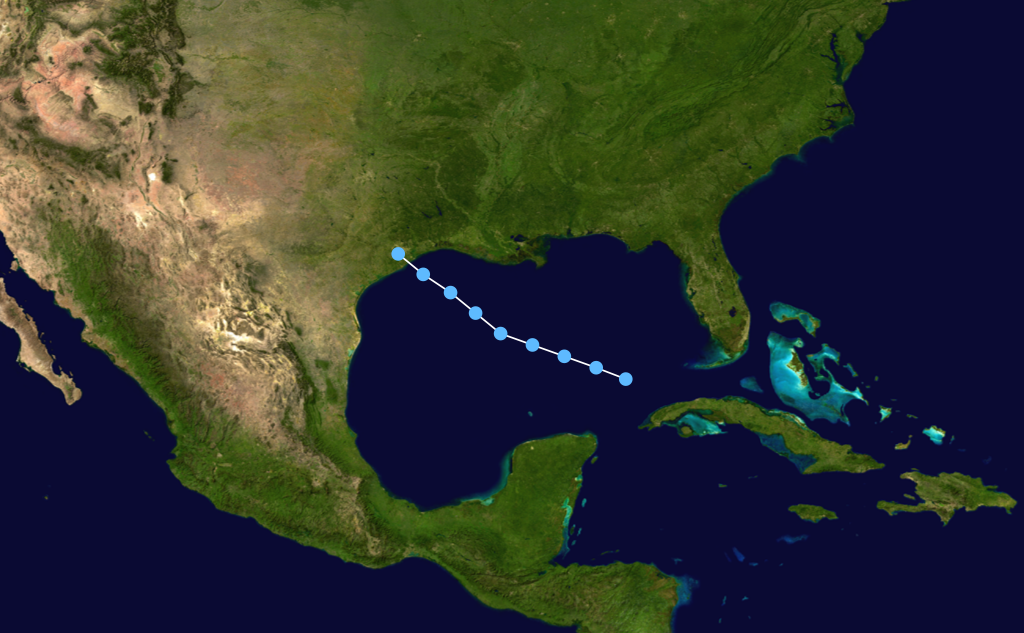
- Duration: August 24 – August 26
- Peak intensity: 35 mph (55 km/h) (1-min); 1010 mbar (hPa)

Around 12:00 UTC on August 24, a tropical depression developed in the southeastern Gulf of Mexico. Moving northwestward, the depression organized further, peaking with maximum sustained winds of 35 mph (55 km/h). It was on the verge of attaining tropical storm status, but made landfall in Texas between Galveston and Freeport on August 26. The depression promptly dissipated.

The depression produced heavy rainfall in Texas, especially in the central parts of the state, with a peak total of 10.75 in (273 mm) in Burnet. A weak cold front, combined with the depression, brought flooding portions of Texas, especially Bell County. In Killeen and Harker Heights, more than 100 people fled their homes, as well as about 50 people from a mobile home park in Nolanville. Flooding damaged 47 homes, 37 mobile homes, and a number of cars. Damage in Bell County was estimated at $100,000. A pickup truck was swept off a low-water crossing at Fort Hood, drowning one occupant of the vehicle. The depression and its remnants also produced rainfall in Arkansas, Kansas, Louisiana, Mississippi, Missouri, and Oklahoma.

=== Hurricane Becky ===
- Category 4 hurricane (SSHWS)
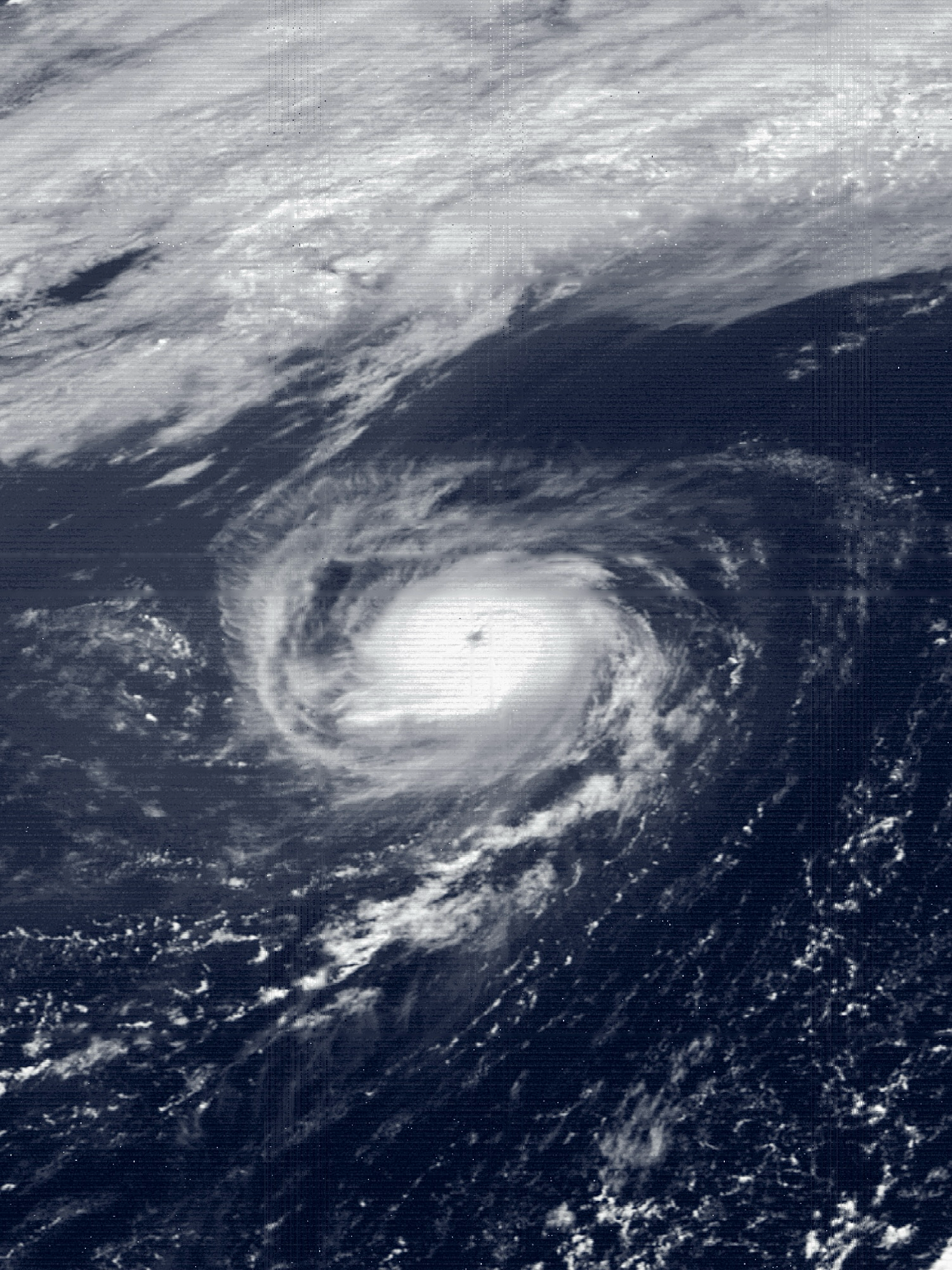
- Duration: August 26 – September 2
- Peak intensity: 130 mph (215 km/h) (1-min); ≤977 mbar (hPa)

The National Hurricane Center first began monitoring an area of shower and thunderstorm activity northeast of the Leeward Islands on August 20. After five days, a circulation became visible on satellite imagery. The disturbance tracked northwest, and both ships observations and satellite imagery indicated the formation of a tropical depression by 12:00 UTC on August 26; at the time, it was centered about 440 mi (710 km) south-southwest of Bermuda. Following designation, the depression curved north and then northeast as it rounded the western periphery of a ridge near the Azores. A light shear environment allowed it to intensify into Tropical Storm Becky by 06:00 UTC on August 28 and further into a hurricane by 18:00 UTC that day.

Around 12:00 UTC on August 29, Becky intensified into a Category 2 hurricane. Early on August 31, the system intensified into a Category 3, and by 12:00 UTC, the storm attained its peak intensity as a Category 4 hurricane with maximum sustained winds of 130 mph (215 km/h), based on earlier observations by a reconnaissance aircraft and satellite observations, despite being near 40°N latitude. Thereafter, Becky accelerated eastward and weakened, falling to tropical storm intensity early on September 2. Later that day, the cyclone merged with a frontal zone northwest of the Azores. Although Becky never posed a threat to land, the storm crossed several major shipping routes.

=== Hurricane Carmen ===
- Category 4 hurricane (SSHWS)
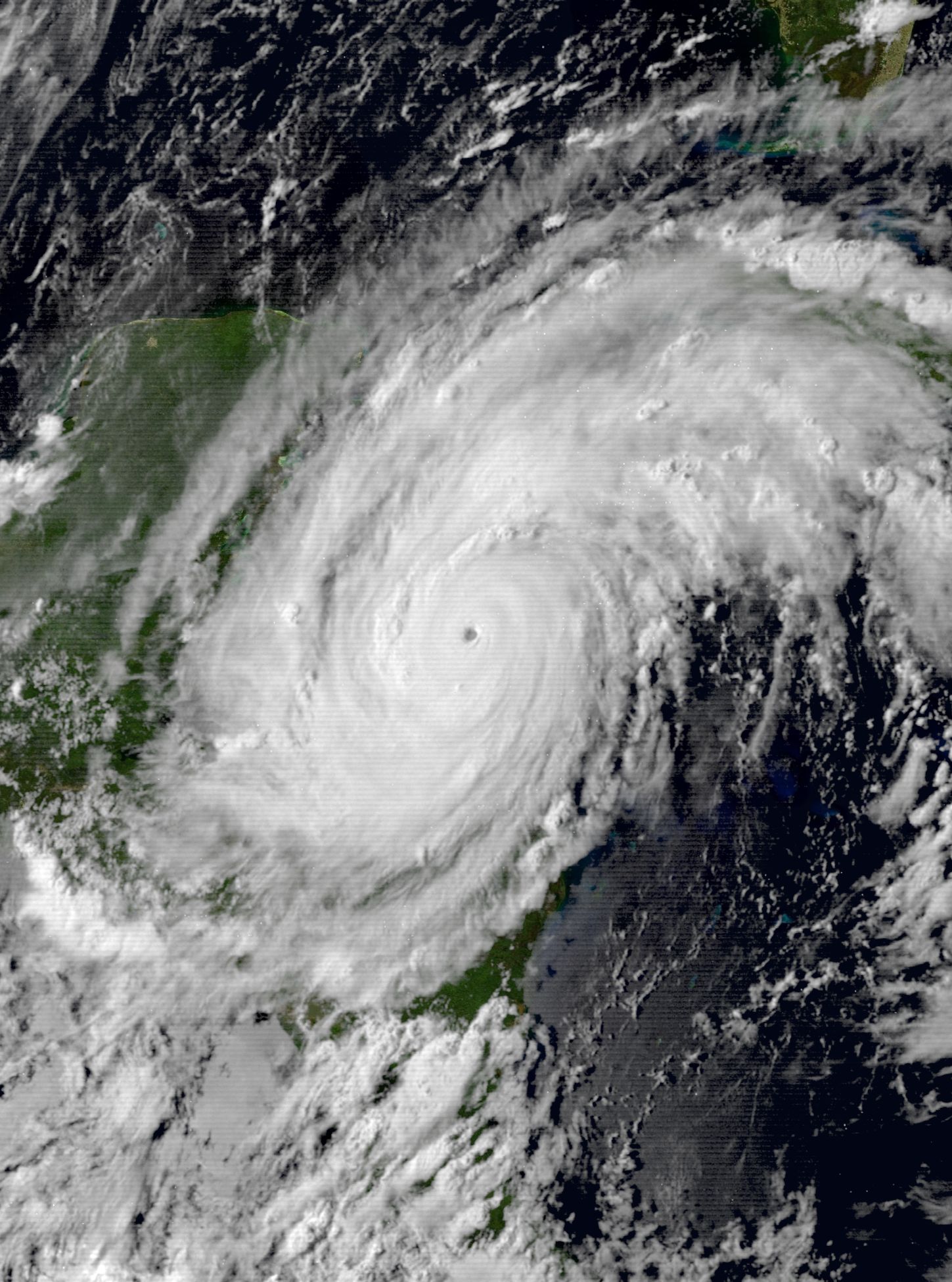
- Duration: August 29 – September 10
- Peak intensity: 155 mph (250 km/h) (1-min); 928 mbar (hPa)

A tropical wave crossed the western coast of Africa on August 23, organizing into a tropical depression by 06:00 UTC on August 29 about 365 mi (585 km) east of Guadeloupe. The newly designated cyclone was slow to intensify initially, with limited inflow and a majority of its circulation over the Greater Antilles. It strengthened into Tropical Storm Carmen early on August 30 and further into a hurricane by 12:00 UTC on August 31. Upon entering the western Caribbean Sea and amid a low wind shear environment, Carmen began a period of rapid intensification and attained peak winds of 155 mph (250 km/h) before moving ashore just north of Chetumal, Quintana Roo. It is possible, given the pressure and satellite trends, that Carmen may have briefly reached Category 5 intensity around 03:00 UTC, but there was insufficient data to conclude such. Carmen weakened significantly over the Yucatán Peninsula, falling to tropical storm intensity by 00:00 UTC on September 3.

Carmen emerged into the Bay of Campeche late on September 3 and almost immediately executed a turn toward the north in response to falling pressures over the Southern United States. The cyclone steadily re-intensified over the Gulf of Mexico, and a reconnaissance aircraft into the storm around 00:00 UTC on September 8 found that maximum winds had again increased to 150 mph (240 km/h). As Carmen approaching the coastline of Louisiana, radar indicated the presence of drier air entering the eastern semicircle of the circulation, and the cyclone moved ashore south of Morgan City with winds of 120 mph (195 km/h). It turned northwest and then west-northwest after landfall and was last monitored as a tropical depression southeast of Waco, Texas, at 06:00 UTC on September 10.

Carmen brought heavy rainfall and a tornado to Puerto Rico, causing about $2 million in damage. Flooding in Jamaica resulted in three people drowning. In Mexico, the storm left hundreds of people homeless in Chetumal and damaged the homes and assets of more than 5,000 people. Four deaths and about $10 million in damage occurred in Mexico. In Louisiana, the storm produced sustained winds up to 110 mph (180 km/h) near Amelia. Along the coast, tides ranged from 4–6 ft (1.2–1.8 m) mean sea level, flooding homes with up to 4 ft (1.2 m) of water or sweeping away some of them into the swamp. Throughout the state, the hurricane inflicted minor damage to 1,015 homes, major damage to 722 homes, and complete destruction to 14 homes. Additionally, 697 mobile homes suffered major damage, while 41 other suffered destruction. However, much of the damage in the state was incurred to crops. Cotton, soybean, sugarcane, and rice crops collectively experienced about $116.8 million in damage. Overall, Carmen caused about $150 million in Louisiana and five deaths in the state. Freshwater and tidal flooding to a lesser degree occurred in the other Gulf Coast states.

=== Tropical Storm Dolly ===
- Tropical storm (SSHWS)
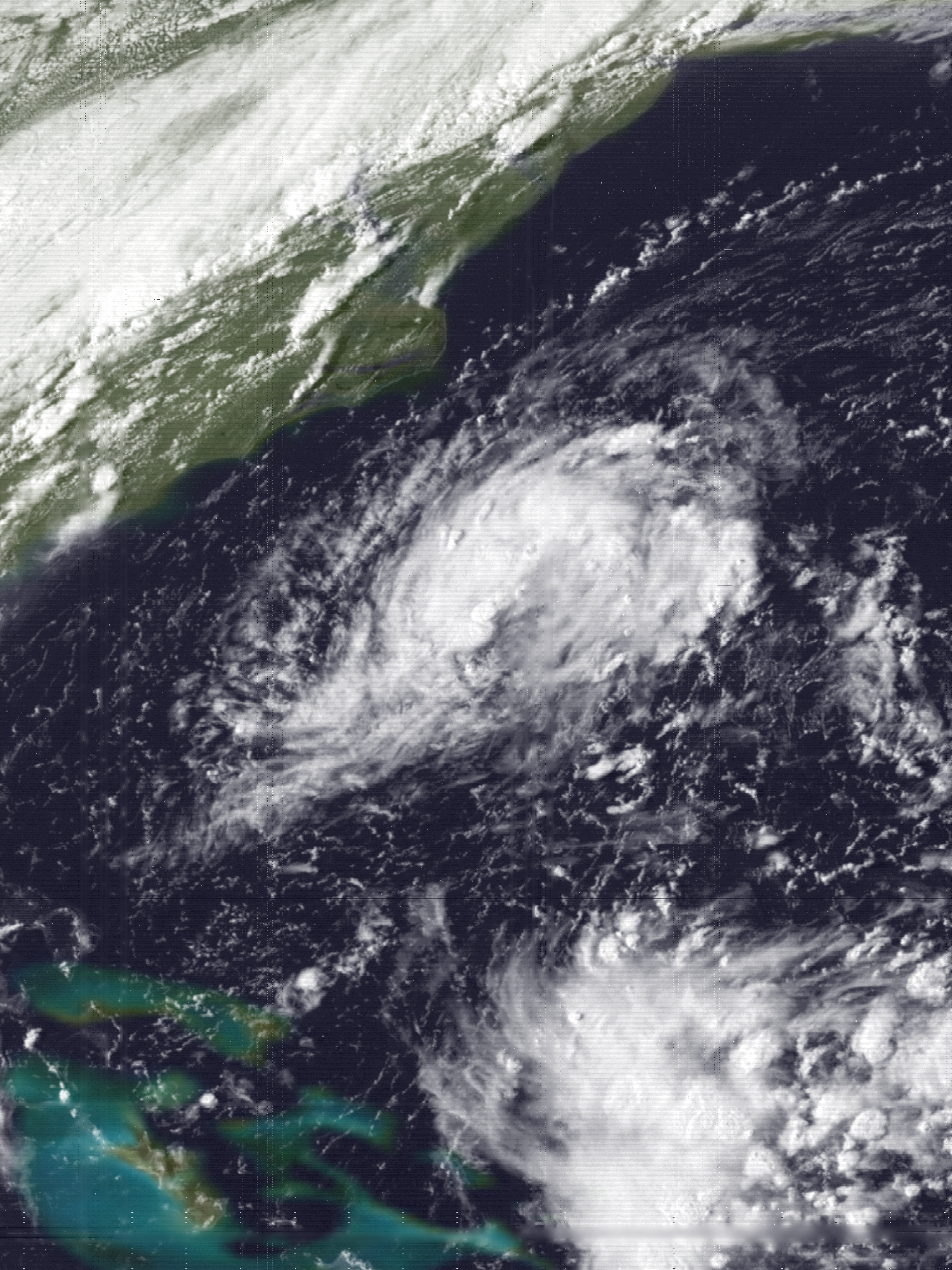
- Duration: September 2 – September 4
- Peak intensity: 60 mph (95 km/h) (1-min); 997 mbar (hPa)

An area of shower and thunderstorm activity became concentrated underneath an upper-level low in the west Atlantic on August 30. The disturbance drifted west-northwest while steadily organizing, and a ship report around 18:00 UTC on September 2 indicated the formation of a tropical depression about 395 mi (635 km) south-southwest of Bermuda. Although the cyclone was embedded within a high wind shear environment, a reconnaissance mission into the storm the next afternoon found that it had intensified into Tropical Storm Dolly. Moving northeast, Dolly attained its peak winds of 60 mph (95 km/h) on the afternoon of September 4. The storm recurved northeast ahead of an approaching trough and transitioned into an extratropical cyclone by 00:00 UTC on September 5 offshore the coastline of Nova Scotia.

=== Tropical Storm Elaine ===
- Tropical storm (SSHWS)
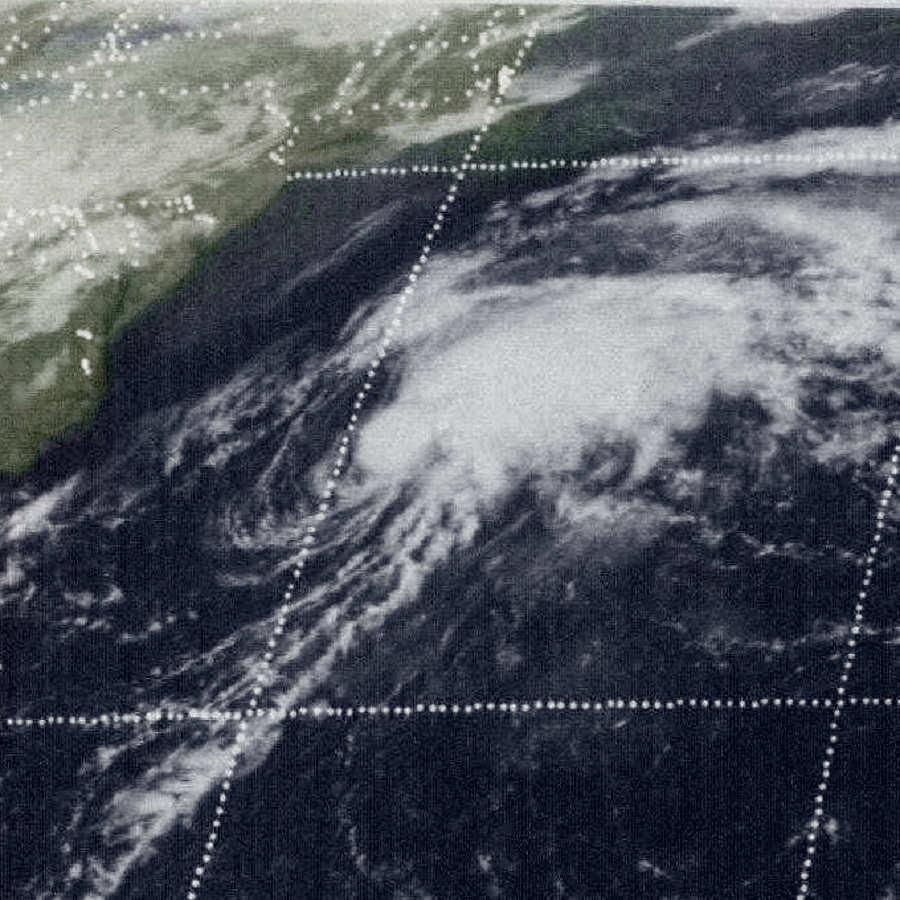
- Duration: September 7 – September 14
- Peak intensity: 65 mph (100 km/h) (1-min); 1001 mbar (hPa)

A tropical wave moved off the western coast of Africa on August 30 and acquired sufficient organization to be declared a tropical depression by 18:00 UTC on September 7 while northeast of the Lesser Antilles. The newly-formed cyclone moved northwest for several days, maintaining its status as a tropical cyclone despite the absence of a closed low-level circulation in several reconnaissance missions. It eventually intensified into Tropical Storm Elaine east of North Carolina by 18:00 UTC on September 9, and with the aid of light upper-level winds, reached peak winds of 65 mph (100 km/h) early the next morning. Steered northeast by an approaching trough, Elaine interacted with a cold front and transitioned into an extratropical cyclone by 06:00 UTC on September 14 over the northern Atlantic.

=== Hurricane Fifi ===
- Category 2 hurricane (SSHWS)
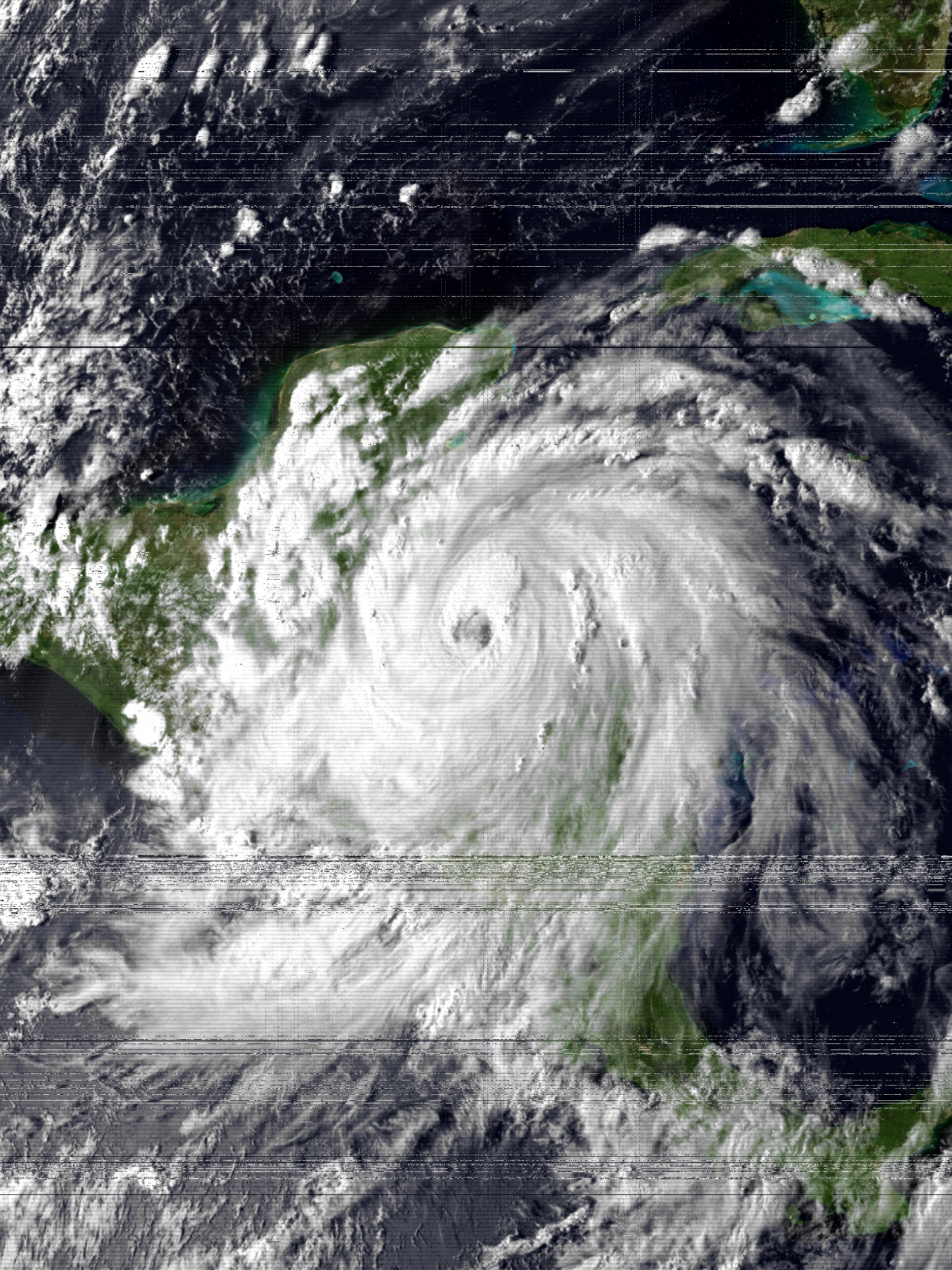
- Duration: September 15 – September 21
- Peak intensity: 100 mph (155 km/h) (1-min); 970 mbar (hPa)

A west-northwestward-moving tropical wave developed into a tropical depression over the eastern Caribbean on September 15. Two days later, the depression intensified into Tropical Storm Fifi just off the coast of Jamaica. The storm quickly intensified into a hurricane the following afternoon and attained its peak intensity on September 18 as a Category 2 hurricane with maximum sustained winds of 100 mph (155 km/h). Maintaining hurricane intensity, Fifi brushed the northern coast of Honduras before making landfall in Belize with winds of 85 mph (140 km/h) the following day. The storm quickly weakened after landfall, becoming a depression late on September 20, and dissipated a day later. Its remnants became associated with a large-scale circulation that led to the formation of a system that would later become Hurricane Orlene.

Fifi brought heavy rainfall to some of the Greater Antilles, especially Jamaica, which recorded precipitation totals exceeding 8 in (200 mm). Parts of the capital city of Kingston were inundated with about 2 ft (0.61 m). The storm caused hundreds of thousands of dollars in damage in Jamaica. While moving westward along the north coast of Honduras, Fifi lashed the country with strong winds and torrential, unrelenting rainfall. Many coastal cities were more than 80% destroyed, while at least 150,000 people were left homeless. The storm also completely destroyed the country's banana crops. Fifi caused at least 8,000 deaths and nearly $1.8 billion in damage in Honduras. Other Central American countries were also affected, especially Guatemala. Torrential rainfall in Guatemala caused flooding which washed away or destroyed numerous bridges, roads, and homes. At least 200 people were killed, making Fifi the deadliest in the country in nearly 20 years. In El Salvador, heavy rainfall from the outer bands of the storm led to flooding which killed 10 people. Flooding in Nicaragua left hundreds of people homeless in some villages including in Jinotega, while communities such as La Conquista, Dulce Nombre, San Gregorio, and San Vicente were left isolated after roads washed away. In Belize, winds and rainfall combined to damage or demolish hundreds of homes. The country's banana crop was completely destroyed.

=== Hurricane Gertrude ===
- Category 2 hurricane (SSHWS)
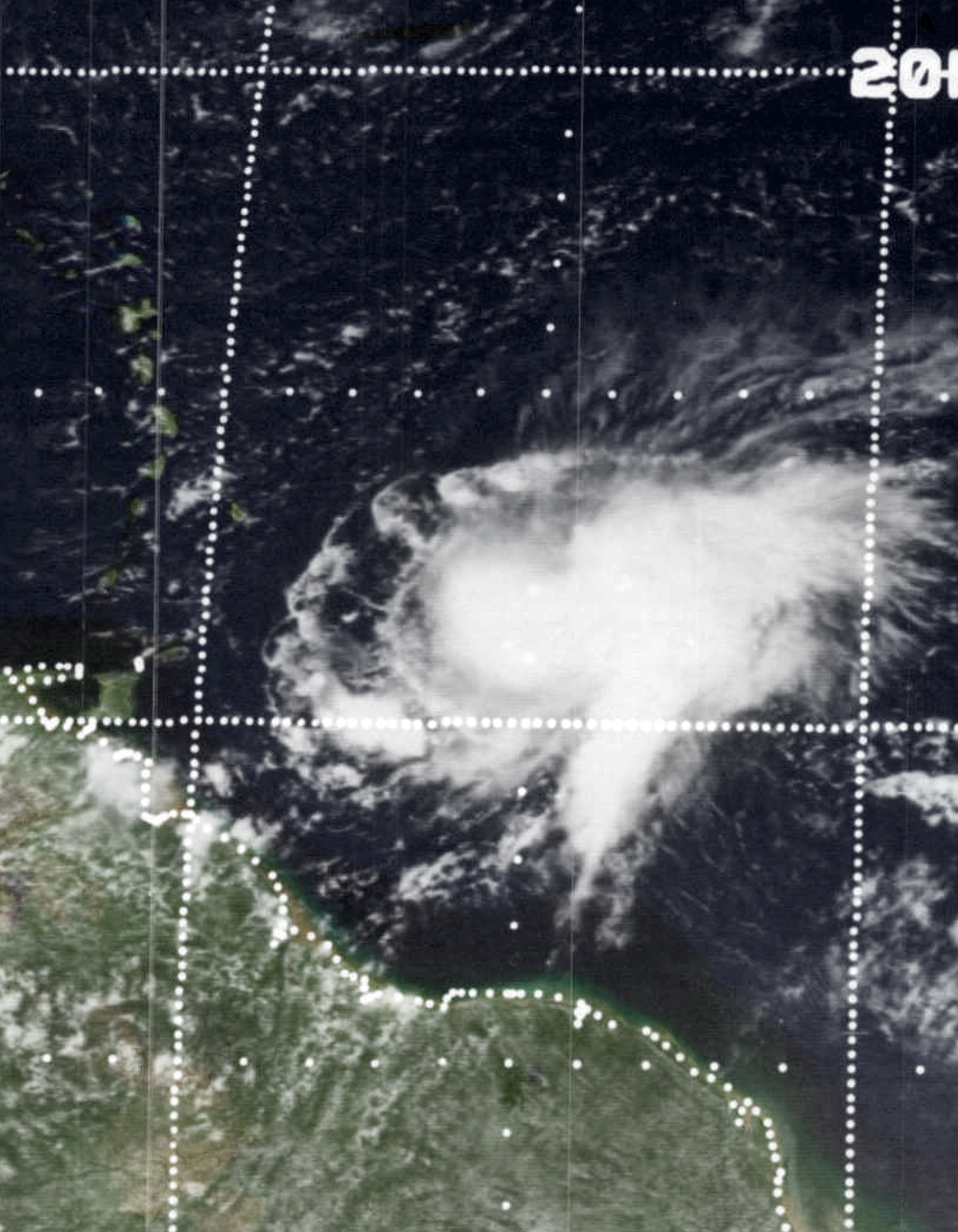
- Duration: September 27 – October 2
- Peak intensity: 100 mph (155 km/h) (1-min); 992 mbar (hPa)

A disturbance developed within the Intertropical Convergence Zone just off the western coast of Africa on September 22. The system moved west-northwest and steadily coalesced, organizing into a tropical depression by 12:00 UTC on September 27 about 985 mi (1,585 km) east-southeast of Barbados. The storm was slow to develop at first, intensifying into Tropical Storm Gertude by 18:00 UTC on September 28. However, a reconnaissance aircraft flight six hours later indicated Gertude had intensified into a hurricane and attained peak winds of 100 mph (155 km/h), although its winds were transient and the storm featured an abnormally high surface pressure. After temporarily stalling, Gertude resumed its west-northwest motion while steadily weakening under the influence of strong upper-level winds. It passed through the southern Leeward Islands on October 2 and dissipated over the central Caribbean by 06:00 UTC on October 2.

=== Subtropical Storm Four ===
- Subtropical storm (SSHWS)
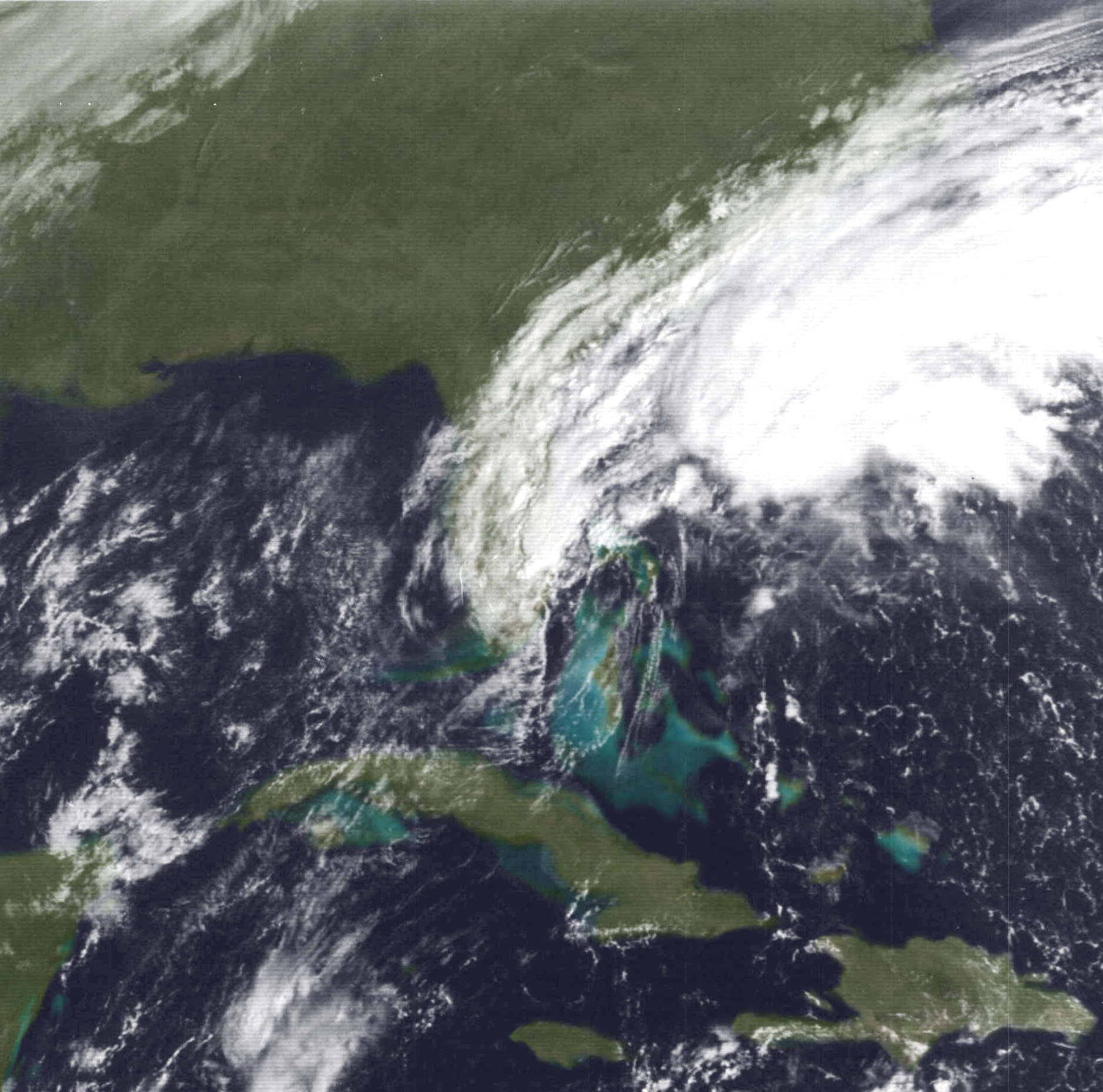
- Duration: October 5 – October 7
- Peak intensity: 65 mph (100 km/h) (1-min); 1003 mbar (hPa)

A low-pressure area developed near just north of eastern Cuba along the axis of a quasi-stationary cold front. The low became a subtropical depression on October 4. Shortly before striking Andros Island on October 6, the system strengthened into a subtropical storm. The storm made its closest approach to Florida early on October 7. Peaking with sustained winds of 65 mph (100 km/h), the system veered northward and then northeastward, but nonetheless caused heavy rainfall and coastal flooding on land in Florida. While paralleling offshore North Carolina and South Carolina, the storm began to slowly weaken. By late on October 8, the subtropical cyclone merged with a cold front while well east of Cape Hatteras. The extratropical remnants persisted for several more hours, before dissipating on October 9.

Gale-force winds were observed by ships and land stations in the Bahamas. The storm and a stationary high pressure system over the Eastern United States resulted in strong winds and rough seas along the coast of Florida for several days, especially on October 6. Many coastal areas observed sustained winds of 25 to 40 mph (40 to 64 km/h), with higher gusts. The storm also produced isolated pockets of heavy rainfall, including 14 in (360 mm) of precipitation in Boca Raton. Dozens of homes were flooded in Boca Raton and Pompano Beach. The heavy rainfall destroyed about 50% of winter vegetable crops in Broward County and about 25% of the eggplant crop and about 5%-10% of other crops in Palm Beach County. The storm also brought rainfall and abnormally high tides to Georgia, South Carolina, North Carolina, and Bermuda. Damage totaled at least $600,000.

=== Unnamed October subtropical storm ===
- Subtropical storm (SSHWS)
- Duration: October 18 – October 20
- Peak intensity: 60 mph (95 km/h) (1-min); ≤1012 mbar (hPa)

A subtropical depression formed about 560 mi (900 km) southwest of Flores Island on October 18. The following day, it intensified into a subtropical storm as it turned to the north. It transitioned into an extratropical cyclone late on October 20 about 400 mi (645 km) west-northwest of Flores Island.

=== Other systems ===
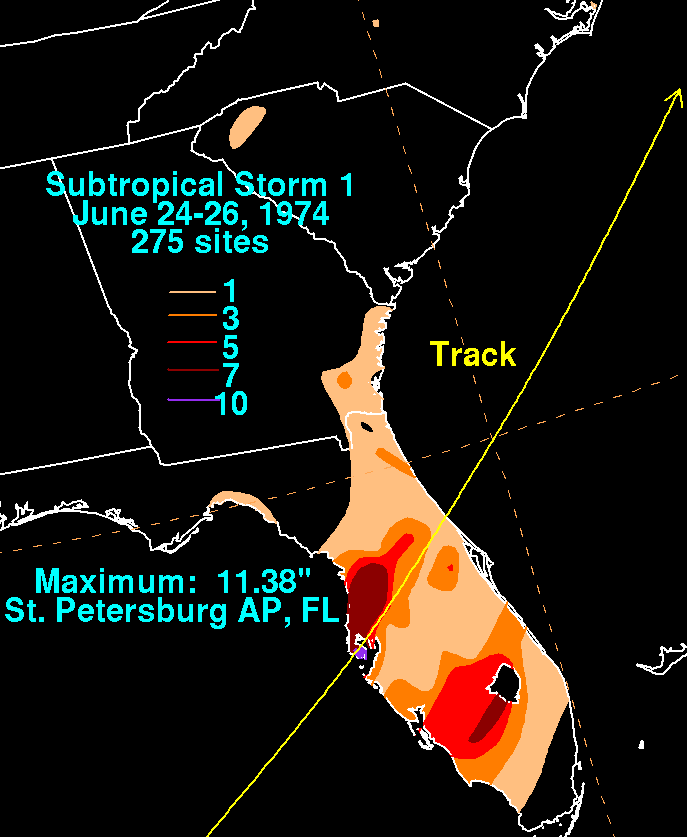
Rainfall associated with a system classified as a subtropical storm until being removed from HURDAT by a reanalysis in 2026

The Atlantic hurricane database (HURDAT) lists three other tropical depressions during the 1974 Atlantic hurricane season. The first such system formed over the northeastern Gulf of Mexico on July 16. It moved northward, moved ashore near Caplen, Texas, on the following day, and promptly dissipated early on July 18. Another tropical depression, known as AL111974, formed north of the Leeward Islands on September 9. The depression moved west-northwestward across the Atlantic for a few days. Passing north of Puerto Rico on September 9, light to moderate rainfall totals were reported on the island and in the United States Virgin Islands, with a peak total of 5.38 in (137 mm) at a substation in Corozal, Puerto Rico. The depression dissipated near Inagua island in the Bahamas on September 11. A third tropical depression, listed in HURDAT as AL161974, originated over the northwestern Caribbean on September 23. Moving northwestward, the storm grazed the northeastern tip of the Yucatán Peninsula on the following day and then entered the Gulf of Mexico. By September 25, the depression turned to the northeast. It weakened and dissipated just offshore the west coast of Florida near Cedar Key on September 27.

In addition to the tropical cyclones, the NHC also tracked a frontal wave in June that hit western Florida, which they operationally designated Subtropical Storm One. The Atlantic hurricane reanalysis removed it as a subtropical cyclone. Rainfall from the system reached 11.38 in (289 mm) in St. Petersburg, Florida, and tides reached 2 to 4 ft (0.61 to 1.22 m) above normal. Three people drowned in Florida, and damage totaled $10 million. Two runways at the St. Petersburg-Clearwater International Airport were submerged. A tornado was reported near Fort Myers. The NHC removed this system from HURDAT in 2026 due to finding little to no evidence of a closed low-pressure area or deep convection organized in a manner similar to a tropical or subtropical cyclone. Thus, it was reclassified as an extratropical storm.

Four other systems previously classified as tropical depressions were also deleted from HURDAT during the 2026 reanalysis of the season, known as AL031974, AL151974, AL191974, and AL201974, which the NHC purported existed from June 30 to July 2, September 18 to September 20, October 30 to November 2, and November 10 to November 12, respectively.

== Timeline ==
June 1

- The 1974 Atlantic hurricane season officially begins.

June 22

- 1200 UTC (7 a.m. CDT) – Tropical Depression One forms in the Gulf of Mexico.

June 26

- 1200 UTC (7 a.m. CDT) – Tropical Depression One dissipates in the central Gulf of Mexico.

July 13

- 1800 UTC (1 p.m. CDT) – Tropical Depression Two forms in the northern Gulf of Mexico just south of the Florida Panhandle.

July 16

- 0000 UTC (8 p.m. EDT July 15) – Subtropical Depression Two forms off the Eastern coast of the United States.

July 17

- 1200 UTC (8 a.m. EDT) – Subtropical Depression Two strengthens into a subtropical storm.
- 1800 UTC (1 p.m. CDT) – Tropical Depression Two makes landfall near Galveston, Texas, and dissipates.

July 18

- 1200 UTC (8 a.m. EDT) – Subtropical Storm Two reaches its peak intensity of 50 mph (85 km/h).

July 20

- 0000 UTC (8 p.m. EDT July 19) – Subtropical Storm Two becomes extratropical east of Newfoundland, Canada.

July 31

- 1200 UTC (10 a.m. AST) – Tropical Depression Three forms just northwest of the Cape Verde Islands off the coast of Africa.

August 2

- 1200 UTC (10 a.m. AST) – Tropical Depression Three dissipates in the central Atlantic Ocean.

August 10

- 1200 UTC (8 a.m. EDT) – Subtropical Storm Three forms south of Cape Cod, Massachusetts.

August 12

- 1200 UTC (8 a.m. EDT) – Tropical Depression Four forms in the southern tropical Atlantic Ocean.

August 13

- 1200 UTC (8 a.m. EDT) – Tropical Depression Four strengthens into a tropical storm and is named Alma.
- 1800 UTC (2 p.m. EDT) – Tropical Storm Alma reaches a peak intensity of 65 mph (100 km/h).

August 14

- 1200 UTC (8 a.m. EDT) – Tropical Storm Alma makes landfall on Trinidad and Tobago with winds of 40 mph (65 km/h).
- 1200 UTC (8 a.m. EDT) – Subtropical Storm Three reaches its peak strength of 60 mph (95 km/h).
- 1800 UTC (2 p.m. EDT) – Tropical Storm Alma makes landfall on Venezuela with winds of 40 mph (65 km/h).

August 15

- 0600 UTC (2 a.m. EDT) – Subtropical Storm Three is absorbed by a frontal boundary just southeast of Nova Scotia, Canada.
- 1800 UTC (2 p.m. EDT) – Tropical Storm Alma rapidly dissipates over the mountains of Venezuela.

August 24

- 1200 UTC (7 a.m. CDT) – Tropical Depression Five forms north of Cuba in the Gulf of Mexico.

August 26

- 1200 UTC (8 a.m. EDT) – Tropical Depression Six forms in the central Atlantic far from land.
- 1200 UTC (7 a.m. CDT) – Tropical Depression Five makes landfall near Galveston, Texas, and dissipates.

August 28

- 0600 UTC (2 a.m. EDT) – Tropical Depression Six strengthens into a tropical storm and is named Becky.
- 1800 UTC (2 p.m. EDT) – Tropical Storm Becky strengthens into a hurricane.

August 29

- 0600 UTC (2 a.m. EDT) – Tropical Depression Seven forms off the Greater Antilles.
- 1200 UTC (8 a.m. EDT) – Hurricane Becky reaches category 2 hurricane strength.

August 30

- 0600 UTC (2 a.m. EDT) – Hurricane Becky reaches major hurricane strength and a peak intensity of 115 mph (185 km/h).
- 1200 UTC (8 a.m. EDT) – Tropical Depression Seven strengthens into a tropical storm and is named Carmen.

August 31

- 1200 UTC (8 a.m. EDT) – Tropical Storm Carmen strengthens into a hurricane.
- 1800 UTC (3 p.m. AST) – Hurricane Becky weakens into a category 2 hurricane.

September 1

- 0600 UTC (2 a.m. EDT) – Hurricane Carmen becomes a category 2 hurricane.
- 1200 UTC (8 a.m. EDT) – Hurricane Carmen becomes a major hurricane.
- 1200 UTC (8 a.m. EDT) – Hurricane Becky weakens into a category 1 hurricane.
- 1800 UTC (2 p.m. EDT) – Hurricane Carmen becomes a category 4 hurricane.

September 2

- 0000 UTC (9 pm. AST September 1) – Hurricane Becky weakens into a tropical storm.
- 0600 UTC (1 a.m. CDT) – Hurricane Carmen reaches its peak intensity of 150 mph (240 km/h).
- 1200 UTC (7 a.m. CDT) – Hurricane Carmen makes landfall on the Yucatan Peninsula with winds of 140 mph (220 km/h).
- 1200 UTC (8 a.m. EDT) – Tropical Storm Becky becomes extratropical in the frigid waters of the North Atlantic Ocean.
- 1800 UTC (1 p.m. CDT) – Hurricane Carmen weakens into a category 2 hurricane.
- 1800 UTC (2 p.m. EDT) – Tropical Depression Nine forms in the central Atlantic ocean.
- 1800 UTC (3 p.m. AST) – Tropical Depression Eight forms off the coast of Africa.

September 3

- 0000 UTC (7 p.m. CDT September 2) – Hurricane Carmen weakens into a tropical storm.
- 1800 UTC (2 p.m. EDT) – Tropical Depression Nine in the central Atlantic strengthens into a tropical storm and is named Dolly. At the same time, it reaches its peak intensity of 50 mph (85 km/h).

September 4

- 1800 UTC (2 p.m. EDT) – Tropical Depression Ten forms in the central Atlantic Ocean.

September 5

- 1200 UTC (7 a.m. CDT) – Tropical Storm Carmen restrengthens into a hurricane.
- 1200 UTC (8 a.m. EDT) – Tropical Storm Dolly becomes extratropical in the frigid waters of the North Atlantic.

September 6

- 1800 UTC (1 p.m. CDT) – Hurricane Carmen restrengthens into a category 2 hurricane.

September 7

- 0000 UTC (7 p.m. CDT September 6) – Hurricane Carmen restrengthens into a major hurricane.
- 1800 UTC (1 p.m. CDT) – Hurricane Carmen restrengthens into a category 4 hurricane.

September 8

- 0000 UTC (7 p.m. CDT September 7) – Hurricane Carmen regains its peak intensity of 150 mph (240 km/h).
- 0600 UTC (1 a.m. CDT) - Hurricane Carmen weakens into a category 3 hurricane as it makes landfall south of Morgan City, Louisiana, with winds of 120 mph (195 km/h).
- 1200 UTC (7 a.m. CDT) - Hurricane Carmen weakens into a category 1 hurricane.
- 1800 UTC (1 p.m. CDT) - Hurricane Carmen weakens into a tropical storm.

September 9

- 0000 UTC (7 p.m. CDT September 8) – Tropical Storm Carmen weakens into a tropical depression.
- 1800 UTC (2 p.m. EDT) – Tropical Depression Ten strengthens into a tropical storm and is named Elaine.

September 10

- 0600 UTC (1 a.m. CDT) – Tropical Depression Carmen dissipates just southeast of Waco, Texas.
- 1200 UTC (8 a.m. EDT) – Tropical Storm Elaine reaches its peak intensity of 70 mph (110 km/h).

September 11

- 1200 UTC (8 a.m. EDT) – Tropical Depression Eight makes landfall of Great Inagua Island in the Bahamas and dissipates.

September 14

- 0000 UTC (8 p.m. EDT September 13) – Tropical Storm Elaine becomes extratropical in the cold waters of the North Atlantic Ocean.
- 1200 UTC (8 a.m. EDT) – Tropical Depression Eleven forms in the Caribbean Sea just south of Puerto Rico.

September 16

- 1800 UTC (2 p.m. EDT) – Tropical Depression Eleven strengthens into a tropical storm and is named Fifi.

September 17

- 0600 UTC (2 a.m. EDT) – Tropical Storm Fifi becomes a hurricane.

September 18

- 0600 UTC (2 a.m. EDT) – Hurricane Fifi strengthens into a category 2 hurricane.
- 1200 UTC (8 a.m. EDT) – Tropical Depression Twelve forms in the central Atlantic Ocean.
- 1800 UTC (1 p.m. CDT) – Hurricane Fifi reaches its peak intensity of 110 mph (180 km/h) while paralleling the Honduran coastline.

September 20

- 0000 UTC (7 p.m. CDT September 19) – Hurricane Fifi makes landfall at the base of the Yucatan Peninsula in Guatemala with winds of 105 mph (170 km/h) and weakens into a tropical storm.
- 1800 UTC (1 p.m. CDT) – Tropical Storm Fifi weakens into a tropical depression.
- 1800 UTC (2 p.m. EDT) – Tropical Depression Fifi dissipates northwest of Bermuda.

September 23

- 1200 UTC (8 a.m. EDT) – Tropical Depression Thirteen forms in the western Caribbean Sea.

September 27

- 1200 UTC (8 a.m. EDT) – Tropical Depression Fourteen forms east of the Lesser Antilles.
- 1200 UTC (8 a.m. EDT) – Tropical Depression Thirteen dissipates just south of Cedar Key, Florida.

September 28

- 1800 UTC (2 p.m. EDT) – Tropical Depression Fourteen strengthens into a tropical storm and is named Gertrude.

September 29

- 0000 UTC (8 p.m. EDT September 28) – Tropical Storm Gertrude rapidly strengthens into a hurricane and reaches its peak intensity of 75 mph (120 km/h).

September 30

- 1800 UTC (2 p.m. EDT) – Hurricane Gertrude weakens into a tropical storm.

October 2

- 1200 UTC (8 a.m. EDT) – Tropical Storm Gertrude weakens into a tropical depression.
- 1800 UTC (2 p.m. EDT) – Tropical Depression Gertrude makes landfall on Carriacou Island in the Grenadines with winds of 35 mph (55 km/h).

October 4

- 0000 UTC (8 p.m. EDT October 3) – Tropical Depression Gertrude dissipates.
- 0000 UTC (8 p.m. EDT October 3) – Tropical Depression Fifteen forms in the waters off Cuba.

October 5

- 1200 UTC (8 a.m. EDT) – Tropical Depression Fifteen becomes subtropical.

October 6

- 0000 UTC (8 p.m. EDT October 5) – The subtropical depression that used to be Tropical Depression Fifteen strengthens into a subtropical storm and is numbered Four.
- 0600 UTC (2 a.m. EDT) – Subtropical Storm Four makes landfall on Grand Bahama Island with winds of 45 mph (70 km/h).

October 7

- 0000 UTC (8 p.m. EDT October 6) – Subtropical Storm Four reaches its peak intensity of 50 mph (80 km/h).

October 8

- 1200 UTC (8 a.m. EDT) – Subtropical Storm Four weakens into a subtropical depression and becomes extratropical.

October 30

- 1200 UTC (8 a.m. EDT) – Tropical Depression Sixteen forms in the central Atlantic Ocean.

November 2

- 1200 UTC (8 a.m. EDT) – Tropical Depression Sixteen dissipates.

November 10

- 1200 UTC (8 a.m. EDT) – Tropical Depression Seventeen forms north of the Dominican Republic.

November 12

- 1200 UTC (8 a.m. EDT) – Tropical Depression Seventeen dissipates.

November 30

- The 1974 Atlantic hurricane season officially ends.

== Storm names ==
The following list of names was used for named storms that formed in the North Atlantic in 1974. Storms were named Carmen, Elaine, and Gertrude for the first (and in the case of Carmen, only) time in 1974.

- Alma
- Becky
- Carmen
- Dolly
- Elaine
- Fifi
- Gertrude
- Hester (unused)
- Ivy (unused)
- Justine (unused)
- Kathy (unused)
- Linda (unused)
- Marsha (unused)
- Nelly (unused)
- Olga (unused)
- Pearl (unused)
- Roxanne (unused)
- Sabrina (unused)
- Thelma (unused)
- Viola (unused)
- Wilma (unused)

=== Retirement ===
The names Carmen and Fifi were retired following the 1974 season.

== Season effects ==
This is a table of all of the storms that formed in the 1974 Atlantic hurricane season. It includes their name, duration, peak classification and intensities, areas affected, damage, and death totals. Deaths in parentheses are additional and indirect (an example of an indirect death would be a traffic accident), but were still related to that storm. Damage and deaths include totals while the storm was extratropical, a wave, or a low, and all of the damage figures are in 1974 USD.

Saffir–Simpson scale
TD	TS	C1	C2	C3	C4	C5

1974 North Atlantic tropical cyclone season statistics
Storm name	Dates active	Storm category at peak intensity	Max 1-min wind mph (km/h)	Min. press. (mbar)	Areas affected	Damage (US$)	Deaths	Ref(s).
Unnamed	June 22–26	Tropical storm	50 (85)	997	Mexico	Unknown	None	
Unnamed	July 14–19	Tropical storm	60 (95)	1007	None	None	None	
Unnumbered	July 16–18	Tropical depression	30 (45)	1013	Texas	Unknown	None	
Unnamed	August 12–15	Subtropical storm	65 (100)	996	None	None	None	
Alma	August 12–15	Tropical storm	60 (95)	≤1007	Windward Islands, Venezuela, Netherlands Antilles, Colombia	$5 million	51	
Unnumbered	August 24–26	Tropical depression	35 (55)	1010	United States Gulf Coast	$100 thousand	1	
Becky	August 26 – September 2	Category 4 hurricane	130 (215)	≤977	None	None	None	
Carmen	August 29 – September 10	Category 4 hurricane	155 (250)	928	Lesser Antilles, Hispaniola, Jamaica, Mexico, Belize, Southern United States	$162 million	12	
Dolly	September 2–4	Tropical storm	60 (95)	997	None	None	None	
Elaine	September 7–14	Tropical storm	65 (100)	1001	None	None	None	
Unnumbered	September 9–11	Tropical depression	35 (55)	1011	The Bahamas	Unknown	None	
Fifi	September 15–21	Category 2 hurricane	100 (155)	970	Hispaniola, Jamaica, Central America, Mexico	$1.8 billion	≥8,210	
Unnumbered	September 23–27	Tropical depression	35 (55)	1003	Mexico, Southeastern United States	Unknown	None	
Gertrude	September 27 – October 2	Category 2 hurricane	100 (155)	992	Windward Islands	Unknown	None	
Four	October 5–7	Subtropical storm	65 (100)	1003	Cuba, Bahamas, Florida, Georgia, South Carolina, North Carolina, Bermuda	$600 thousand	None	
Unnamed	October 18–20	Subtropical storm	60 (95)	≤1012	Azores	None	None	
Season aggregates
16 systems	June 22 – October 20		155 (250)	928		$1.99 billion	≥8,277	

== See also ==
- 1974 Pacific hurricane season
- 1974 Pacific typhoon season
- 1974 North Indian Ocean cyclone season
- Australian cyclone seasons: 1973–74, 1974–75
- South Pacific cyclone seasons: 1973–74, 1974–75
- South-West Indian Ocean cyclone seasons: 1973–74, 1974–75
- South Atlantic tropical cyclone
- Mediterranean tropical-like cyclone
