= Savonette gas field =

Gas field in the Atlantic Ocean, Trinidad and Tobago

Savonette
- Country: Trinidad and Tobago
- Region: Atlantic Ocean
- Offshore/onshore: offshore
- Operator: BP

Field history
- Discovery: 2004
- Start of production: 2009
- Peak year: 2013

Production
- Estimated gas in place: 57×10^{9} m^{3} 2×10^{12} cu ft

The Savonette gas field is a natural gas field located in the Atlantic Ocean. It was discovered in 2004 and developed by BP. Natural gas production began in late October 2009. The total proven reserves of the Savonette gas field are around 2 trillion cubic feet (57 billion m³), and production is slated to be around 250 million cubic feet/day (714,000 m³). Production peaked in 2013 at 545 million cubic feet per day and in 2021 approximately 65% of gas had been extracted and at time accounted for 8% of Trinidad and Tobago’s daily production.
