= 1970 hurricane season =

1970 hurricane season may refer to:

- The 1970 Atlantic hurricane season
- The 1970 Pacific hurricane season
