= List of storms named Dorothy =

The name Dorothy has been used for three tropical cyclones in the Atlantic Ocean:

- Hurricane Dorothy (1966) – formed in July in the north Atlantic Ocean, remained away from land
- Tropical Storm Dorothy (1970) – Deadliest tropical storm of the season, caused 51 deaths, mostly in Martinique, while moving through the Lesser Antilles
- Hurricane Dorothy (1977) – formed near Bermuda and became extratropical near Newfoundland

== See also ==
Storms with similar names

- Storm Dorothea (2024) – a European windstorm
- Tropical Storm Dorothee (1973) – a South-West Indian Ocean moderate tropical storm
