= Hurricane Alma (1970) =

Category 1 Atlantic hurricane in 1970

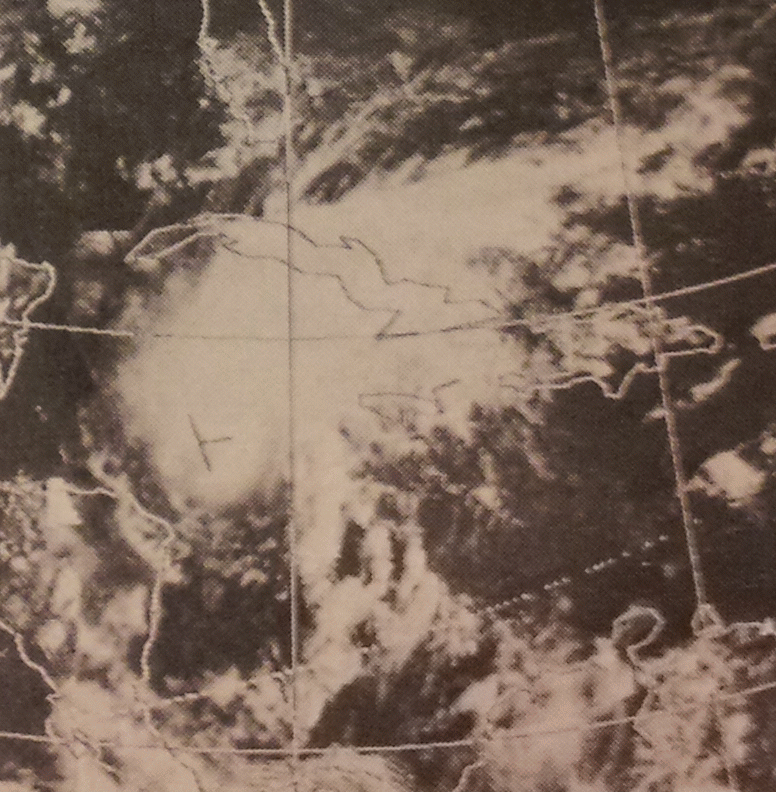
- Alma on May 20

Meteorological history
- Formed: May 17, 1970
- Dissipated: May 27, 1970

Category 1 hurricane
- 1-minute sustained (SSHWS/NWS)
- Highest winds: 75 mph (120 km/h)
- Lowest pressure: 993 mbar (hPa); 29.32 inHg

Overall effects
- Fatalities: 8 total
- Areas affected: Cayman Islands, Jamaica, Cuba, Southeast United States
- IBTrACS
- Part of the 1970 Atlantic hurricane season

Hurricane Alma was a short-lived hurricane in May 1970 that affected the western Caribbean and southeastern United States. It developed on May 17, north of Panama, and rapidly intensified on May 20 to peak winds of 75 mph (120 km/h), near Jamaica and the Cayman Islands. It stalled south of Cuba and deteriorated due to wind shear, and by May 22 it weakened to tropical depression status. After progressing northwestward and crossing western Cuba, Alma reorganized in the Gulf of Mexico, although continued shear prevented strengthening. It moved across Florida on May 25, and on May 27 it dissipated off the coast of Virginia.

The storm first brought gusty winds and heavy rainfall to Jamaica and the Cayman Islands. While it was weakening, Alma produced flooding in central and eastern Cuba, causing seven deaths and forcing 3,000 people to evacuate. Moderate precipitation spread across Florida, while thunderstorms from the storm caused light damage, killing one. Moisture from the storm spread up the Atlantic coast.

== Meteorological history ==
Map plotting the storm's track and intensity, according to the Saffir–Simpson scale Map key Saffir–Simpson scale Tropical depression (≤38 mph, ≤62 km/h) Tropical storm (39–73 mph, 63–118 km/h) Category 1 (74–95 mph, 119–153 km/h) Category 2 (96–110 mph, 154–177 km/h) Category 3 (111–129 mph, 178–208 km/h) Category 4 (130–156 mph, 209–251 km/h) Category 5 (≥157 mph, ≥252 km/h) Unknown Storm type Tropical cyclone Subtropical cyclone Extratropical cyclone, remnant low, tropical disturbance, or monsoon depression

An area of convection, or thunderstorms, increased over the western Caribbean Sea on May 16. A day later, it organized into a tropical depression about 470 miles (760 km) southeast of Kingston, Jamaica. It moved slowly to the northwest, strengthening into Tropical Storm Alma on May 20 as it developed more rainbands. Around that time, the storm curved to the northeast and rapidly strengthened amid favorable conditions, including low wind shear and strong outflow. Late on May 20, Alma attained hurricane status, with maximum sustained winds of 75 mph (120 km/h), based on aircraft reconnaissance reports. The flight observed an eye with a diameter of 18 mi (28 km), located within a central dense overcast. Within six hours of becoming a hurricane, Alma began weakening due to increased wind shear. The storm turned to the west, passing south of the Cayman Islands on May 22. That day, the National Hurricane Center (NHC) discontinued advisories after Alma weakened into a tropical depression, with only a few thunderstorms. On May 23, the depression moved across western Cuba, before entering the Gulf of Mexico. The circulation became better defined with a spiral-band structure, and on May 24, the NHC resumed advisories. However, continued wind shear prevented further strengthening. On May 25, Alma hit northwestern Florida near Cedar Key as a tropical depression. Continuing to the northeast, Alma regained tropical storm status over land, based on nearby ship observations. On May 27, an approaching cold front absorbed the storm near the North Carolina coast.

== Impact ==
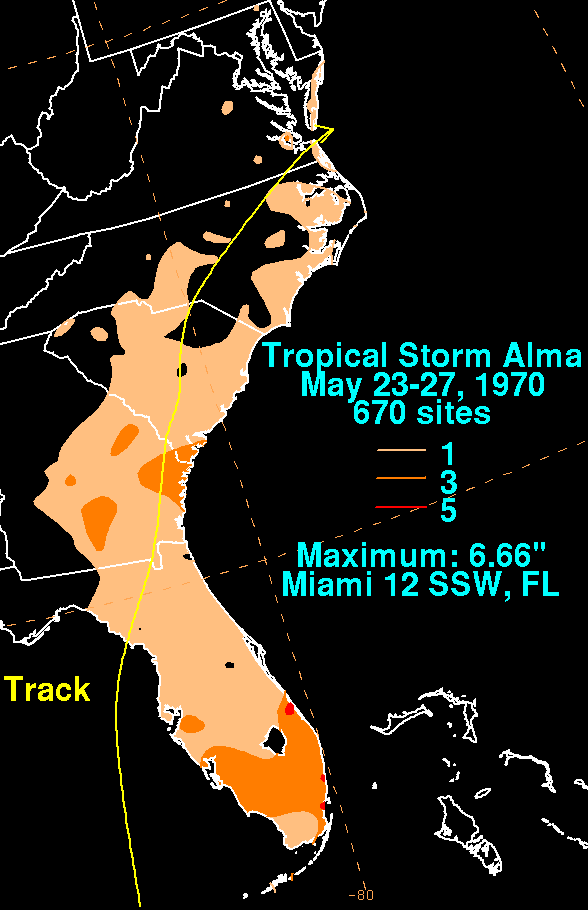
Rainfall map

While passing near the Cayman Islands, Alma produced wind gusts of 65 mph (105 km/h). Gale-force winds and heavy rainfall occurred in Jamaica. Heavy rains ahead of the storm caused flash flooding in central and eastern Cuba, killing seven people. The storm damaged crops and closed 16 sugar mills, while several homes were destroyed. About 3,000 evacuated their homes in eastern Cuba, including some by helicopter.

In Miami, Florida, lightning struck and killed a girl. The storm produced rainfall across the southeastern United States, peaking at 6.66 in (16.9 cm) near Miami. The rainfall across Florida alleviated drought and fire conditions. A thunderstorm near Fort Myers damaged some roofs and outbuildings. In Saint Petersburg, flooding disrupted phonelines in about 400 households. Merritt Island experienced 45 mph (72 km/h) wind gusts. Outside of Florida, statewide precipitation peaks included 4.62 in (117 mm) in Alapaha, Georgia, 4.62 in (117 mm) in Hilton Head, South Carolina, and 2.71 in (69 mm) in Albemarle, North Carolina. Near Columbia, South Carolina, the remnants of Alma spawned a tornado which destroyed a roof.

== See also ==
- List of off-season Atlantic hurricanes
- 1970 Atlantic hurricane season
