= Tropical Storm Becky (1970) =

Atlantic tropical storm in 1970

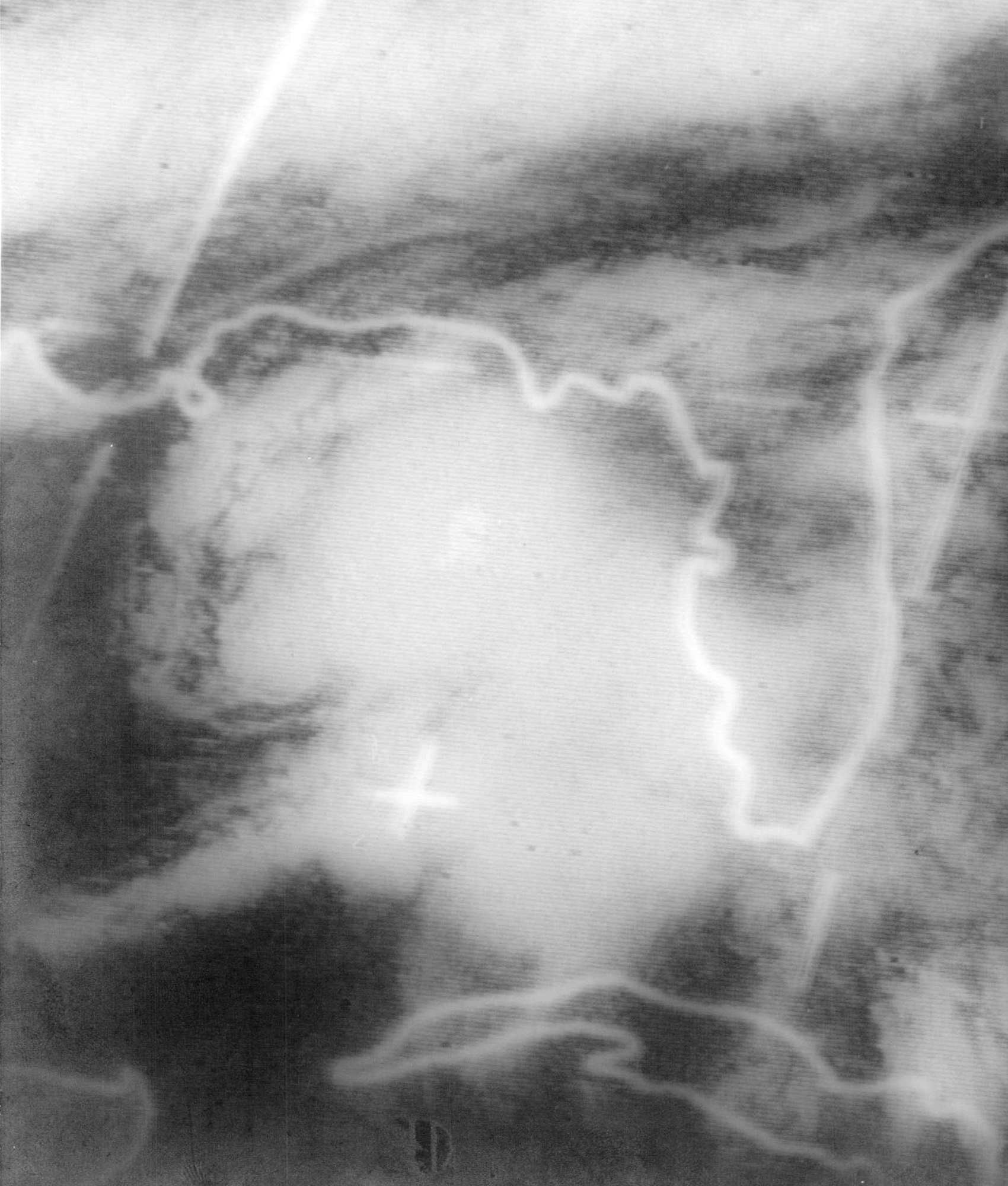
- Tropical Storm Becky on July 21

Meteorological history
- Formed: July 19, 1970
- Dissipated: July 23, 1970

Tropical storm
- 1-minute sustained (SSHWS/NWS)
- Highest winds: 65 mph (100 km/h)
- Lowest pressure: 1003 mbar (hPa); 29.62 inHg

Overall effects
- Fatalities: 1
- Damage: $500,000 (1970 USD)
- Areas affected: Gulf Coast, Southeast United States
- IBTrACS
- Part of the 1970 Atlantic hurricane season

Tropical Storm Becky was the second tropical cyclone and named storm of the 1970 Atlantic hurricane season. Becky formed from a tropical depression that was designated on July 19. The next day it organized over the Yucatán Channel and became Tropical Storm Becky. Initially thought to have attained minimal hurricane status, Becky reached peak winds of 65 mph (100 km/h), but the storm began to deteriorate shortly thereafter. The storm made landfall on the Florida Panhandle on July 22, and rapidly weakened over land. Overall, damage was related to heavy rainfall that caused flooding in Tallahassee, Florida; 104 families suffered flood-related losses. About $500,000 (1970 USD) in damage was attributed to the storm. Further north, the heavy rainfall swelled rivers. Becky may have been partially responsible for spawning tornadoes that destroyed or damaged several houses.

== Meteorological history ==
Map plotting the storm's track and intensity, according to the Saffir–Simpson scale Map key Saffir–Simpson scale Tropical depression (≤38 mph, ≤62 km/h) Tropical storm (39–73 mph, 63–118 km/h) Category 1 (74–95 mph, 119–153 km/h) Category 2 (96–110 mph, 154–177 km/h) Category 3 (111–129 mph, 178–208 km/h) Category 4 (130–156 mph, 209–251 km/h) Category 5 (≥157 mph, ≥252 km/h) Unknown Storm type Tropical cyclone Subtropical cyclone Extratropical cyclone, remnant low, tropical disturbance, or monsoon depression

On July 16, 1970, a large disturbance separated from the Intertropical Convergence Zone near Panama. The broad area of convection dominated the region between Swan Island and western Cuba by July 18. Some sources state that the area of convection was joined by a low-level vortex that entered the area, eventually forming a depression. Others believe that the origins of Becky can be tracked back to a tropical wave that moved off the coast of Africa on July 9. A tropical depression formed on July 19, 1970. As the depression moved through the Yucatán Channel, the convective cloud system became better organized. On July 20, in light of data from a Reconnaissance Aircraft flight, the depression was upgraded to Tropical Storm Becky.

The storm moved roughly northward under the influence of the Bermuda High to the east and a low-pressure area over Mexico. Reports from a Reconnaissance flight indicated that Becky was disorganized, with a minimum barometric pressure of 1,008 mbar (29.8 inHg). Although a fairly strong low-level circulation developed, there was insufficient warming of the center to produce a significant drop in barometric pressure at the surface. Late on July 20, a ship reported a minimum pressure of about 1,003 mbar (29.6 inHg), and another ship reported sustained winds of 65 mph (100 km/h), which would be Becky's peak intensity. A Reconnaissance flight and weather radars suggested the development of an eye feature, and initially it was believed that the storm attained minimal hurricane status. Later it was later confirmed that Becky remained a tropical storm, and the previously forming eye failed to persist.

On July 21, the storm deteriorated in organization as it continued northward. The lack of banding features indicated that by early on July 22, Becky was barely a tropical storm. The storm made landfall near Port St. Joe, Florida shortly thereafter, and weakened rapidly as it moved inland; as a rainstorm, it progressed northward into the Midwestern United States and completely dissipated over Michigan.

== Preparations ==
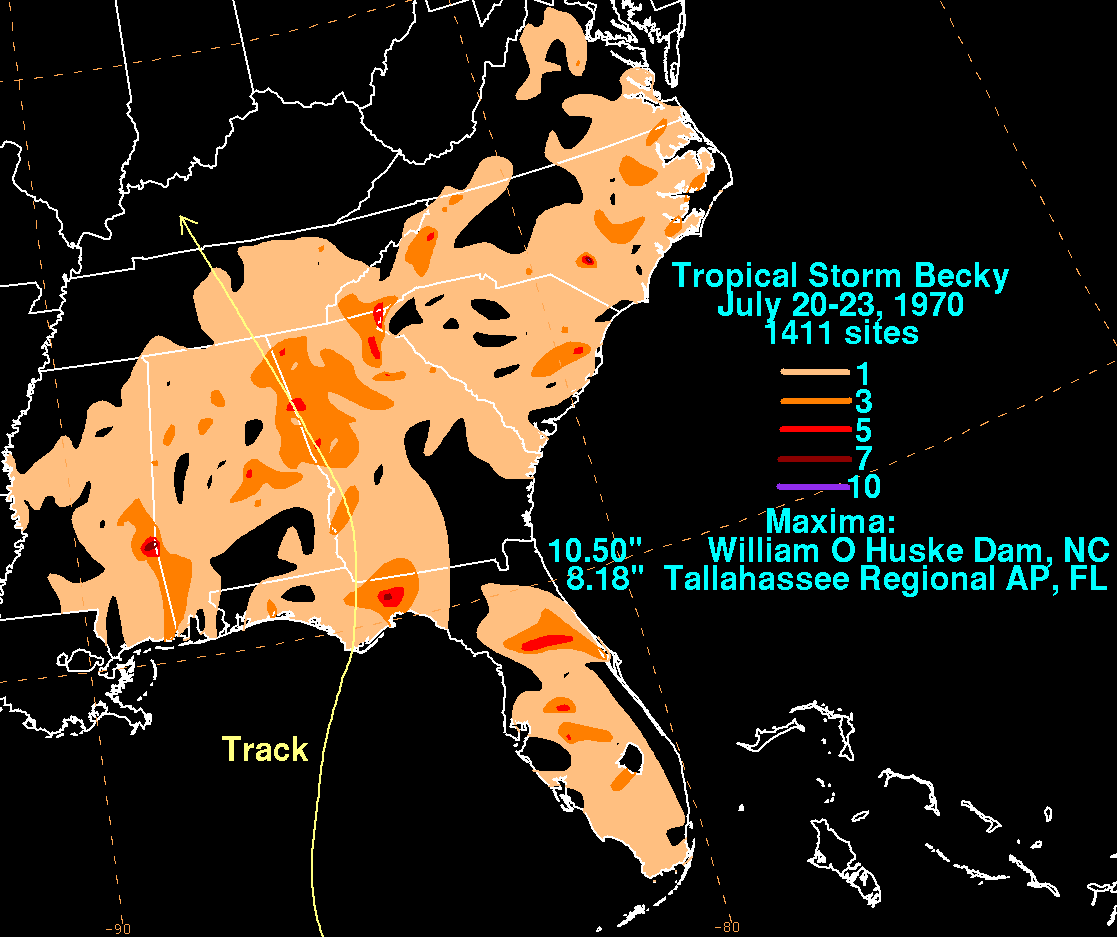
Storm total rainfall from Becky

Offshore, Shell Oil removed some workers and equipment from offshore platforms. A hurricane warning was issued from Fort Walton, Florida to Port St. Joe, Florida. Similarly, a gale warning was posted for coastal areas of Alabama and Florida. A hurricane watch was issued for locations in Mississippi and Louisiana. On July 22, a tornado watch was posted for northern Florida. Tornado warnings were also issued, and a flash flood watch was declared for parts of western North Carolina. Gale warnings were posted from Panama City, Florida to St. Marks, Florida, with the expectation of winds to 50 mph (80 km/h). Heavy rainfall of up to 8 inches (200 mm) was predicted, and tides of 2 to 4 feet (0.61 to 1.22 m) forecast. Isolated tornadoes were possible as the storm made landfall.

Thousands of residents were evacuated from the Panhandle of Florida, including Santa Rosa Island and Destin, as well as other low-lying locations. Some residents evacuated to storm shelters that were set up in various cities along the coast. A store in Destin reported increased sales in hurricane-related supplies such as canned goods and flashlights. Florida Governor Claude Kirk ordered health units and law enforcement to operate on emergency alert. Small craft in the northeastern Gulf of Mexico were advised to remain in port until the high seas subsided.

== Impact ==
Upon making landfall, a barometric pressure of 1007 mb accompanied the storm. Along the coast of the Panhandle, gale-force winds and tides of 3 feet (0.91 m) above-normal were reported. Tallahassee, Florida received 8 inches (0.20 m) of rainfall; due to the heavy precipitation, serious flooding occurred. At Anna Marie Island in Florida, heavy rainfall and squalls accompanied by winds of 56 miles per hour (90 km/h) were reported. In South Carolina, heavy precipitation led to rivers approaching flood stage. Locally heavy rainfall caused rivers to rise in North Carolina, though they remained below flood stage. Along the Cape Fear River, a boat ramp was washed out. Farther towards the north in Georgia and Alabama, the rainfall helped to relieve persistent drought conditions.

According to the Red Cross, 104 families in the Tallahassee region suffered flood-related losses, and two injuries were reported. There, winds gusted to 44 miles per hour (71 km/h). Flood waters were knee-deep around a county courthouse at Crawfordville, Florida. In low-lying areas, flooding damaged homes, and to the southwest of Tallahassee, 4 feet (1.2 m) of water forced the evacuation of 15 homes by rowboat. Over 100 cars were stranded in the flooding. As precautionary measures, a few secondary roads were closed in the region. Damage from Becky in the state totaled $500,000 (1970 USD), mostly in Leon and Wakulla counties. Two injuries were reported.

Several tornadoes were reported. Near Panacea, Florida, a tornado destroyed a house and damaged two others. Another tornado in Emanuel County, Georgia killed one person and demolished two homes. However, due to the conditions that spawned the tornadoes, they are not directly attributed to Becky.

== See also ==
- List of Florida hurricanes
- List of wettest tropical cyclones in the United States
