= 1970 Caribbean–Azores hurricane =

Atlantic hurricane in 1970

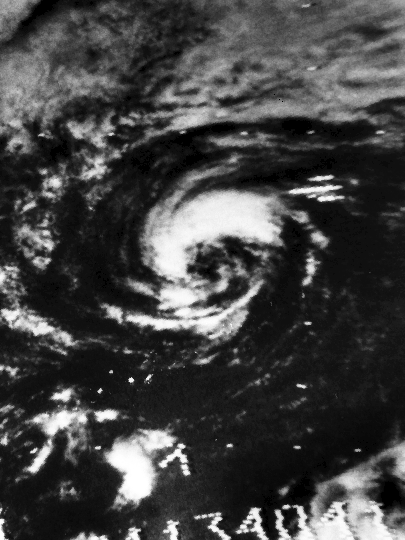
- Satellite image of the hurricane to the southwest of the Azores

Meteorological history
- Formed: September 30, 1970
- Dissipated: October 22, 1970

Category 1 hurricane
- 1-minute sustained (SSHWS/NWS)
- Highest winds: 85 mph (140 km/h)
- Lowest pressure: 989 mbar (hPa); 29.21 inHg

Overall effects
- Fatalities: 22 total
- Damage: >$65.5 million (1970 USD)
- Areas affected: Lesser Antilles (especially Barbados and United States Virgin Islands), Puerto Rico
- IBTrACS
- Part of the 1970 Atlantic hurricane season

The 1970 Caribbean–Azores hurricane was an unnamed Atlantic hurricane that became the wettest known tropical cyclone on record to affect the United States territory of Puerto Rico. The long-lived system formed on September 24 just off the west coast of Africa and, for several days, maintained a general westward track. It passed through the Lesser Antilles on October 1 and later stalled in the eastern Caribbean Sea. On October 8, the depression crossed over the Dominican Republic and subsequently accelerated to the northeast. It was declassified as a tropical cyclone on October 12, although its remnants persisted for another week before dissipating in the westerlies near the Azores.

The depression produced heavy rainfall in the Lesser Antilles, reaching 12 in (300 mm) on Barbados. It resulted in three deaths and moderate damage on the island, while another death was reported in the United States Virgin Islands. Torrential rainfall on Puerto Rico inflicted heavy damage, totaling $65 million (1970 USD, $517 million 2026 USD). The highest precipitation total was 41.68 in (1,059 mm) in Jayuya, of which 17 in (430 mm) fell in a 24‑hour period. Most of the damage can be attributed to damaged sugar cane and coffee crops. At least 18 people were killed on the island, and the system was considered one of the worst disasters in Puerto Rican history.

== Meteorological history ==
Map plotting the storm's track and intensity, according to the Saffir–Simpson scale Map key Saffir–Simpson scale Tropical depression (≤38 mph, ≤62 km/h) Tropical storm (39–73 mph, 63–118 km/h) Category 1 (74–95 mph, 119–153 km/h) Category 2 (96–110 mph, 154–177 km/h) Category 3 (111–129 mph, 178–208 km/h) Category 4 (130–156 mph, 209–251 km/h) Category 5 (≥157 mph, ≥252 km/h) Unknown Storm type Tropical cyclone Subtropical cyclone Extratropical cyclone, remnant low, tropical disturbance, or monsoon depression

The origins of the depression were identified as a tropical wave on September 22 over western Africa. The system exited the west coast of Africa the next day, and on September 24, it developed into a tropical depression about 95 mi (153 km) southwest of Conakry, Guinea. The depression moved generally westward, gradually intensifying to attain peak winds of 35 mph (56 km/h) by September 25. A nearby upper-level trough — an elongated area of low pressure — hindered further strengthening, and on October 1, the depression struck the island of Saint Lucia. As it crossed the Lesser Antilles, its winds and barometric pressure approached the values of a tropical storm.

In the Caribbean, the trough caused the depression to slow to a westward drift, resulting in several days of heavy rainfall in the region, particularly Puerto Rico. One forecast on October 5 anticipated a continued westward track toward Jamaica. Instead, the depression turned to the north the next day under the influence of the upper-level westerlies. On October 7, the depression attained its lowest pressure of 1000 mbar (29.53 inHg) off the southern coast of Hispaniola. The next day, it made landfall in Peravia Province in the Dominican Republic. After crossing the country and exiting into the Atlantic Ocean, the depression accelerated to the northeast, followed by an eastward turn on October 10 before another turn to the northeast. By October 12, the depression could no longer be classified as a tropical cyclone, although satellite imagery indicated that its remnants continued northeastward. On October 15, the system turned to the west, suppressed by a strong high-pressure area to its north. It re-intensified while crossing through the Azores, attaining a pressure of 994 mbar. It turned to the northwest and was absorbed into the westerlies on October 20.

== Preparations, impact, and aftermath ==
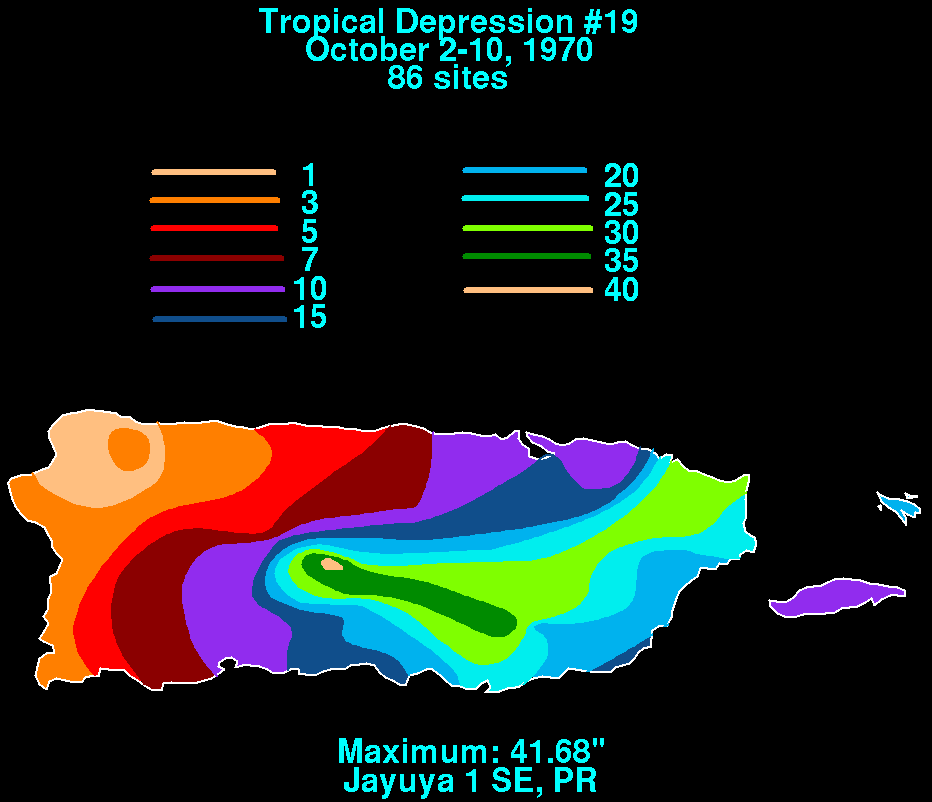
Rainfall map in Puerto Rico

Around October 3, forecasters advised residents on islands from Barbados and St. Vincent through Guadeloupe to prepare for floods, high seas, and gale-force gusts. On October 10, a warning to be on guard against gusts was issued to owners of light aircraft in Puerto Rico and the Virgin Islands. As it crossed through the islands, the depression produced heavy rainfall, including 8.90 in (226 mm) on Saint Lucia, 2.19 in (56 mm) on Dominica, and 12 in (300 mm) on Barbados. In the latter island, the depression left 200 people homeless, caused $500,000 in damage, and killed three people.

Heavy rains impacted the U.S. Virgin Islands, including a total of 11.4 in (290 mm) recorded by the National Park Service on Saint John. The rains caused flooding across the territory, washing out roads and destroying several houses. One boy was swept away by the floodwaters, although he was rescued by two people. A girl was also swept by the floods and drowned. The desalination plant on Saint Croix was damaged during the floods, temporarily stopping the supply of drinking water; water from Puerto Rico had to be shipped to provide the 700,000 gallons needed daily. On St. Thomas, the main airport was closed for several days.

For six days, the depression dropped rainfall across the northern Caribbean, particularly in Puerto Rico. The highest overall rainfall total was 41.68 in (1,059 mm), recorded at a station near Jayuya in the center of the island. This was the highest rainfall total from a tropical cyclone on record in Puerto Rico, surpassing that of the deadly hurricanes of 1928 and 1899, which produced 29.6 in (750 mm) and 23.0 in (580 mm), respectively. The station at Jayuya also recorded 17 in (430 mm) in 24 hours. Four other locations reported over 30 in (760 mm). Such heavy rainfall caused 20 rivers to swell above flood stages.

The depression left 10,000 people homeless across Puerto Rico, with 3,000 housed in emergency shelters in San Juan. At least 600 houses were destroyed and another 1,000 damaged. Damage was particularly severe in Barceloneta, Aibonito, and Coamo. Across the island, the depression affected at least 40 state roads, with fifteen blocked by landslides, and eleven bridges destroyed. Flooding forced the closure of Puerto Rico Highway 2 between Manatí and Barceloneta. The depression left more than $40 million (1970 USD, $318 million 2026 USD) in crop damage, primarily to sugarcane and coffee, as reported by William R. Poage, the chair of the House Agricultural Committee. Throughout Puerto Rico, the depression caused damage estimated at $65 million (1970 USD, $517 million 2026 USD), as well as at least 18 confirmed fatalities. A report six months after the depression indicated there were 34 people missing, although their status is unknown.

In the aftermath of the disaster, Luis A. Ferré, the Governor of Puerto Rico, declared a state of emergency over the entire island, asking for $10 million (1970 USD) in federal aid. On October 12, two days after the rains subsided, President Richard Nixon declared the territory as a disaster area. Ferre also appeared in a telethon to raise funds for the homeless. The National Guard, the Red Cross, and other volunteer groups were deployed to help those who were displaced. In all, the disaster was described as one of the worst in Puerto Rico history. The Governor of the Virgin Islands, Melvin Evans, requested aid similar to Puerto Rico, and that territory was also declared a federal disaster area about a week after the rains ended. The heavy rainfall in the Virgin Islands caused a marked dinoflagellate algal bloom in the days after the rains ended.

== See also ==
- List of unnamed tropical cyclones
