= 1970 Canada hurricane =

Category 2 Atlantic hurricane in 1970

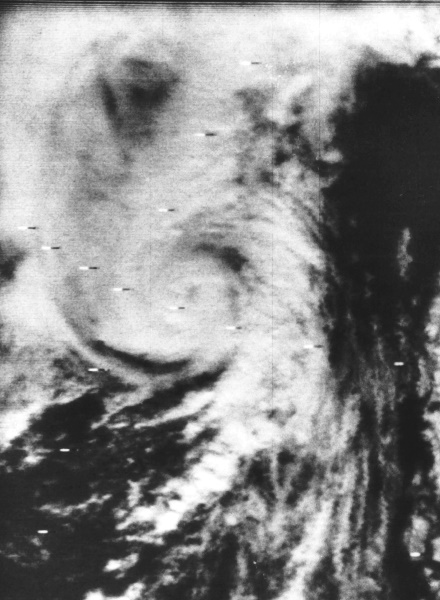
- The hurricane on October 17

Meteorological history
- Formed: October 12, 1970
- Extratropical: October 17
- Dissipated: October 20, 1970

Category 2 hurricane
- 1-minute sustained (SSHWS/NWS)
- Highest winds: 105 mph (165 km/h)
- Lowest pressure: 974 mbar (hPa); 28.76 inHg

Overall effects
- Fatalities: None
- Damage: $1,000 (1970 USD)
- Areas affected: Bermuda, Atlantic Canada, Saint Pierre and Miquelon
- IBTrACS
- Part of the 1970 Atlantic hurricane season

The 1970 Canada hurricane was an unnamed tropical cyclone that brought impact to Bermuda and Newfoundland. The fourth hurricane and ninth tropical storm of the Atlantic hurricane season, this system developed northeast of the Bahamas as a subtropical depression on October 12. While tracking northeastward, the system intensified, becoming a subtropical storm on the following day. The subtropical storm transitioned into a tropical cyclone on October 16, and strengthened into a hurricane about twelve hours later. The hurricane later bypassed Bermuda, before further intensifying into a Category 2 hurricane on the Saffir–Simpson hurricane wind scale. Thereafter, the hurricane accelerated rapidly northeastward, and made landfall on the Avalon Peninsula of Newfoundland as a Category 1 hurricane. It transitioned into an extratropical cyclone early on October 17.

The system produced tropical storm force winds on Bermuda, which caused the suspension of schools, transportation, and interrupted businesses, although minimal structural damage occurred. Light rainfall was also reported on the island. Hurricane-force winds were observed throughout Newfoundland, which caused damage to structures, though mostly limited to broken windows. Rough seas damaged fishing dories and a fishing ramp on the Atlantic coast of the island. The cost of damage on the Burin Peninsula was estimated to be in the thousands of dollars, although the specific figure in unknown. Heavy rainfall was also reported in the region, with precipitation in Quebec reaching nearly 5 inches (130 mm). On the French Territory of Saint Pierre and Miquelon, several buildings and houses lost their roof due to strong winds.

== Meteorological history ==
Map plotting the storm's track and intensity, according to the Saffir–Simpson scale Map key Saffir–Simpson scale Tropical depression (≤38 mph, ≤62 km/h) Tropical storm (39–73 mph, 63–118 km/h) Category 1 (74–95 mph, 119–153 km/h) Category 2 (96–110 mph, 154–177 km/h) Category 3 (111–129 mph, 178–208 km/h) Category 4 (130–156 mph, 209–251 km/h) Category 5 (≥157 mph, ≥252 km/h) Unknown Storm type Tropical cyclone Subtropical cyclone Extratropical cyclone, remnant low, tropical disturbance, or monsoon depression

On October 11, 1970, satellite images indicated that a tropical depression developed north of Hispaniola. However, according to post-analysis, a subtropical depression actually formed on October 12 at 1200 UTC. The depression slowly intensified over the next few days, and became a subtropical storm on October 12, though this was operationally unnoticed by the National Hurricane Center. By October 13, satellite imagery indicated that convection associated with the depression merged with a weak stationary front. As a result, the National Hurricane Center no longer considered it purely tropical and classified the system as a "subtropic storm" on October 14. Later that day, the National Hurricane Center began issuing special bulletins for the storm, indicating the possibility of the system acquiring tropical characteristics.

Early on October 16, satellite imagery indicated that the storm was developing a cloud pattern typical of a normal tropical cyclone. In addition, Reconnaissance aircraft flight data indicated that a warm core was developing. As a result, the system had acquired enough characteristics to be considered a tropical cyclone at 0000 UTC on that day. Later that day, the storm strengthened enough to be upgraded to a hurricane at 1200 UTC. Six hours later, the system passed just west of Bermuda, although winds were well below hurricane force on the island. Spiral cloud bands and an eye feature were observed on radars as the hurricane bypassed the island. The warm core persisted into October 17, which indicated that the hurricane was fully tropical for at least 30–36 hours. Early on October 17, the National Hurricane Center discontinued bulletins on the system, while it was located about 150 miles (240 km) northeast of Bermuda.

At 0600 UTC on October 17, the system intensified into a Category 2 hurricane on the Saffir–Simpson hurricane wind scale. Six hours later, the hurricane attained its peak intensity with maximum sustained winds of 105 mph (169 km/h) and a minimum barometric pressure of 974 mbar (28.8 inHg). Although a radio bulletin by the Naval Communications Station Washington, D.C. Transmitter (NSS) at 1200 UTC noted that it had hurricane characteristics, the National Hurricane Center did not name the storm. By 1800 UTC, a cold front began impacting the circulation of the hurricane, which caused the storm to weaken back to a Category 1 hurricane, and began losing its tropical characteristics. At approximately 2330 UTC on October 17, the hurricane made landfall on the Avalon Peninsula of Newfoundland with winds of 80 mph (130 km/h). Only 30 minutes later, the hurricane transitioned into an extratropical cyclone. The remnant extratropical cyclone curved abruptly northward and later re-emerged into the Atlantic, before dissipating on October 20.

== Impact ==
Late on October 16, the storm passed close to Bermuda as a minimal Category 1 hurricane, causing strong winds on the island. Maximum sustained winds of 48 mph (77 km/h) and gusts up to 58 mph (93 km/h) were recorded. At an elevated location, an anemometer reported sustained winds as high as 100 mph (160 km/h). Strong winds caused the suspension of school, transportation, and disruption to businesses across Bermuda. A riot started by the recurrence of vandalism and arson plagued the island for two weeks leading up to the storm. However, merchants and police were forced to ease their anti-riot efforts to board up their windows. In addition to high winds, the storm also produced light rainfall on the island of Bermuda, which peaked at 1.68 inches (43 mm).

Shortly before transitioning into an extratropical cyclone, the hurricane moved across the extreme southeastern portion of Newfoundland at Category 1 intensity. As a result, high winds were reported across the region; wind speeds of 90 mph (140 km/h) occurred on the Burin Peninsula. Wind damage occurred throughout the island, although mostly limited to broken windows, trees being uprooted, and fences knocked over. In addition, a house under construction blew over in Marystown; another house was abandoned in St. John's for the fear of the roof blowing off. Hydro poles also caught fire in Burin and Grand Banks. Rough seas caused by the storm sunk or damage several fishing dories in Grand Bank and three fishing premises were washed away in Lamaline. In addition, a fishing ramp was washed out to sea in Lourdes Cove. Damage in the Burin Peninsula alone totaled to thousands of dollars, although the exact figure is unknown.

Heavy rainfall also occurred across much of the Atlantic Canada region, especially in areas well west of the path of the storm. The highest amount of precipitation from the storm was reported in Quebec, where rainfall peaked at 4.9 inches (120 mm) in the extreme eastern part of the province. Rainfall occurred further north into Labrador, with precipitation of at least 1 inch (25 mm) being reported as far north as Groswater Bay. Further south in the provinces of Prince Edward Island, Nova Scotia, and New Brunswick, rainfall amounts did not exceed 4 inches (100 mm). No flooding was reported in Atlantic Canada. On the offshore French Territory of Saint Pierre and Miquelon, severe wind damage was also reported on Saint-Pierre. Several homes and a church lost its roof.

== See also ==
- List of Bermuda hurricanes
- List of Canada hurricanes
