= 1970 Atlantic hurricane season =

- Season summary map

Seasonal boundaries
- First system formed: May 17, 1970
- Last system dissipated: December 1, 1970

Strongest storm
- Name: Celia
  - Maximum winds: 140 mph (220 km/h) (1-minute sustained)
  - Lowest pressure: 944 mbar (hPa; 27.88 inHg)

Seasonal statistics
- Total depressions: 20
- Total storms: 14
- Hurricanes: 7
- Major hurricanes (Cat. 3+): 2
- Total fatalities: 115 total
- Total damage: $1.03 billion (1970 USD)

Related articles
- 1970 Pacific hurricane season; 1970 Pacific typhoon season; 1970 North Indian Ocean cyclone season

The 1970 Atlantic hurricane season officially began on June 1 and lasted until November 30. These dates conventionally delimit the period of each year when most tropical cyclones form in the Atlantic basin. The season was fairly average, with 14 named storms forming, of which seven were hurricanes. Two of those seven became major hurricanes, which are Category 3 or higher on the Saffir–Simpson scale. Also, this was the first season in which reconnaissance aircraft flew into all four quadrants of a tropical cyclone.

The first system, Hurricane Alma, developed on May 17. The storm killed eight people, seven from flooding in Cuba and one from a lightning strike in Florida. In July, Tropical Storm Becky brought minor flooding to Florida and other parts of the Southern United States, leaving one death and about $500,000 (1970 USD) in damage. The most significant storm of the season was Hurricane Celia, a Category 4 hurricane that slammed South Texas in early August. Celia resulted in about $930 million in damage and was the costliest hurricane in Texas until Alicia in 1983. There were 28 fatalities, with four in Cuba, eight in Florida, and sixteen in Texas. Later that month, Tropical Storm Dorothy caused severe flooding in Martinique, which left up to 51 deaths and $34 million in damage. One death occurred in Mexico as a result of Hurricane Ella after a house collapsed. In October, Tropical Depression Fifteen brought a devastating flood to Puerto Rico. At least 22 fatalities and $65.5 million in damage occurred. Collectively, the storms of this season left at least $1.03 billion in damage and 115 deaths.

== Season summary ==
The Atlantic hurricane season officially began on June 1, though activity began slightly earlier with Hurricane Alma forming on May 17. Although 21 tropical depressions developed, only fourteen of them reached tropical storm intensity. However, this was well-above the 1950–2000 average of 9.6 named storms per season. Seven of these reached hurricane status, slightly above the 1950–2000 average of 5.9. Furthermore, two storms reached major hurricane status, near the average 1950–2000 average of 2.3. Collectively, the cyclones of this season caused at least 115 deaths and over $1.03 billion in damage. The Atlantic hurricane season officially ended on November 30, though the final tropical cyclone became extratropical on December 1.

Tropical cyclogenesis began in May, with Alma developing on May 17. No tropical cyclone activity occurred in June. Three systems originated in July, including Tropical Storm Becky and the depression that would eventually intensify into Hurricane Celia, as well as another tropical depression that remained below tropical storm intensity. Celia became the most intense tropical cyclone of the season on August 3, peaking as a Category 3 hurricane on the Saffir–Simpson scale with maximum sustained winds of 140 mph (220 km/h) and a minimum barometric pressure of 944 mbar (27.88 inHg). In August, four tropical systems developed, including two tropical depressions, an unnamed hurricane, and Dorothy. September eight featured tropical depressions, though only three became named storms – Ella, Felice, and Greta. October featured two unnamed hurricanes. Two more systems, a tropical depression and an unnamed tropical storm, developed in November, the latter of which transitioned into an extratropical cyclone on December 1, ending the season's activity.

The season's activity was reflected with an accumulated cyclone energy (ACE) rating of 67. ACE is a metric used to express the energy used by a tropical cyclone during its lifetime. Therefore, a storm with a longer duration will have high values of ACE. It is only calculated at six-hour increments in which specific tropical and subtropical systems are either at or above sustained wind speeds of 39 mph (63 km/h), which is the threshold for tropical storm intensity.

== Systems ==
=== Hurricane Alma ===
- Category 1 hurricane (SSHWS)
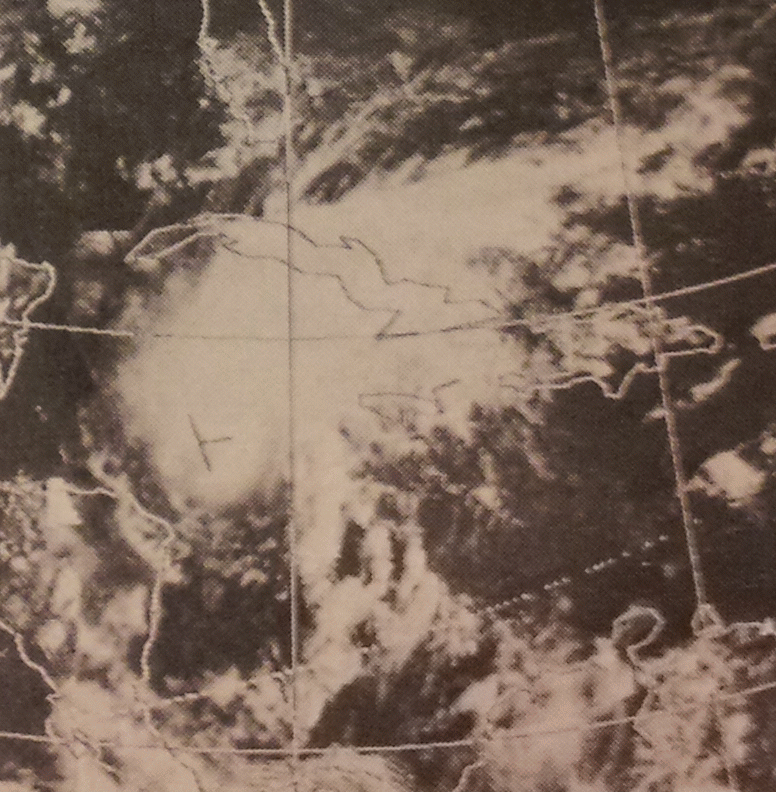
- Duration: May 17 – May 26
- Peak intensity: 75 mph (120 km/h) (1-min); 993 mbar (hPa)

An area of disturbed weather persisted over the southwestern Caribbean in the middle of May. It gradually organized, and a tropical depression formed on May 17. In response to low wind shear and warm sea surface temperatures, the depression rapidly strengthened to a tropical storm early on May 20 and to a hurricane that night. However, increasing upper-level wind shear caused Alma to deteriorate back into a tropical depression on May 22. The depression continued its general northward movement, with a brief jog to the west, and struck Cuba on May 24 with maximum winds of 30 mph (48 km/h). As Alma crossed the eastern Gulf of Mexico, it retained a well-defined circulation with an eye feature evident on weather radar, but the persistent shear limited the system's intensity. Tropical Depression Alma made landfall near Cedar Key, Florida, on May 25 and became extratropical two days later over North Carolina.

Although Alma passed just offshore, impact in Central America, if any, is unknown. In the Cayman Islands, winds of 65 mph (105 km/h) were reported. Impact was most severe in Cuba, where flash flooding caused seven fatalities, destroyed several homes, forced the evacuation of 3,000 people in Oriente Province, and forced 16 sugar mills to suspend operations. The storm brought light rainfall to Florida, though precipitation peaked at 6.66 in (169 mm) near Miami. Thunderstorms caused one death in Miami and damaged some buildings in Fort Myers. In other states, impact came mostly in the form of rain, though a tornado near Columbia, South Carolina, unroofed one building.

=== Tropical Storm Becky ===
- Tropical storm (SSHWS)
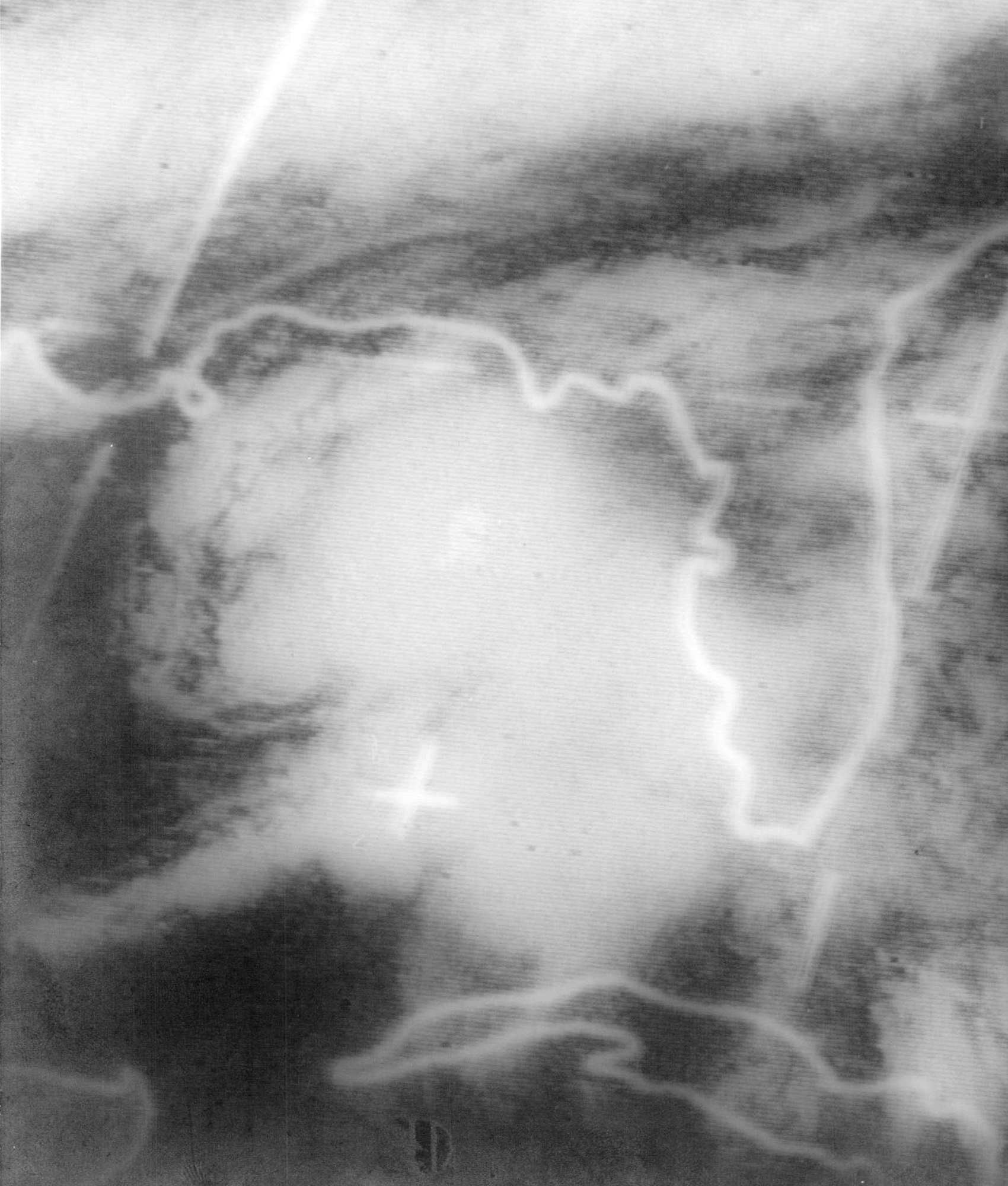
- Duration: July 19 – July 23
- Peak intensity: 65 mph (100 km/h) (1-min); 1003 mbar (hPa)

A large disturbance began to detach from the Intertropical Convergence Zone near Panama on July 16. By July 19, the disturbance developed into a tropical depression. After tracking through the Yucatán Channel, the depression became Tropical Storm Becky on July 20. Becky tracked northward to north-northeastward across the Gulf of Mexico and eventually strengthened to reach peak winds of 65 mph (100 km/h) late on July 20. Thereafter, upper-level winds began weakening the storm. By July 22, Becky made landfall near Port St. Joe, Florida, as a tropical depression. The storm weakened further over land, eventually dissipating over western Kentucky on the July 23.

Throughout Florida, Becky produced mostly light rainfall and gale-force winds. However, in Tallahassee, the storm dropped more than 8 in (200 mm) of rain, which caused flooding in and around the city. According to the Red Cross, 104 families in the Tallahassee region suffered flood-related losses. Additionally, two injuries were reported. Some houses near Tallahassee were flooded with 4 ft (1.2 m) of water, resulting in the evacuation of 15 households by rowboat. More than 100 cars in the area were also submerged. In nearby Wakulla County, knee-deep waters were reported at the county courthouse in Crawfordville. A tornado spawned near Panacea, destroyed a house and damaged two others. Light to moderate rain fell in neighboring states, and a tornado in Georgia caused one fatality and destroyed two homes.

=== Hurricane Celia ===
- Category 4 hurricane (SSHWS)
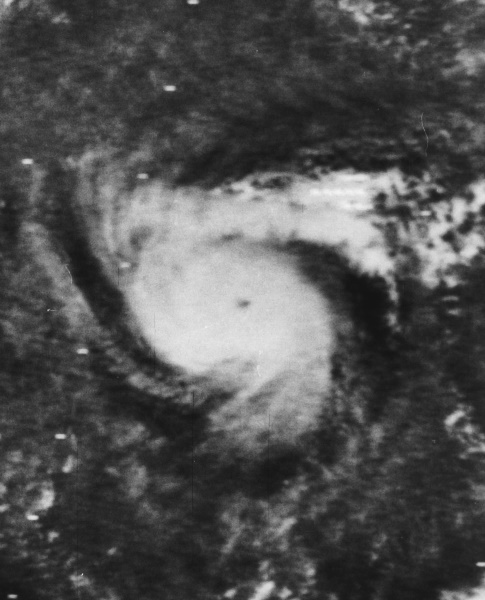
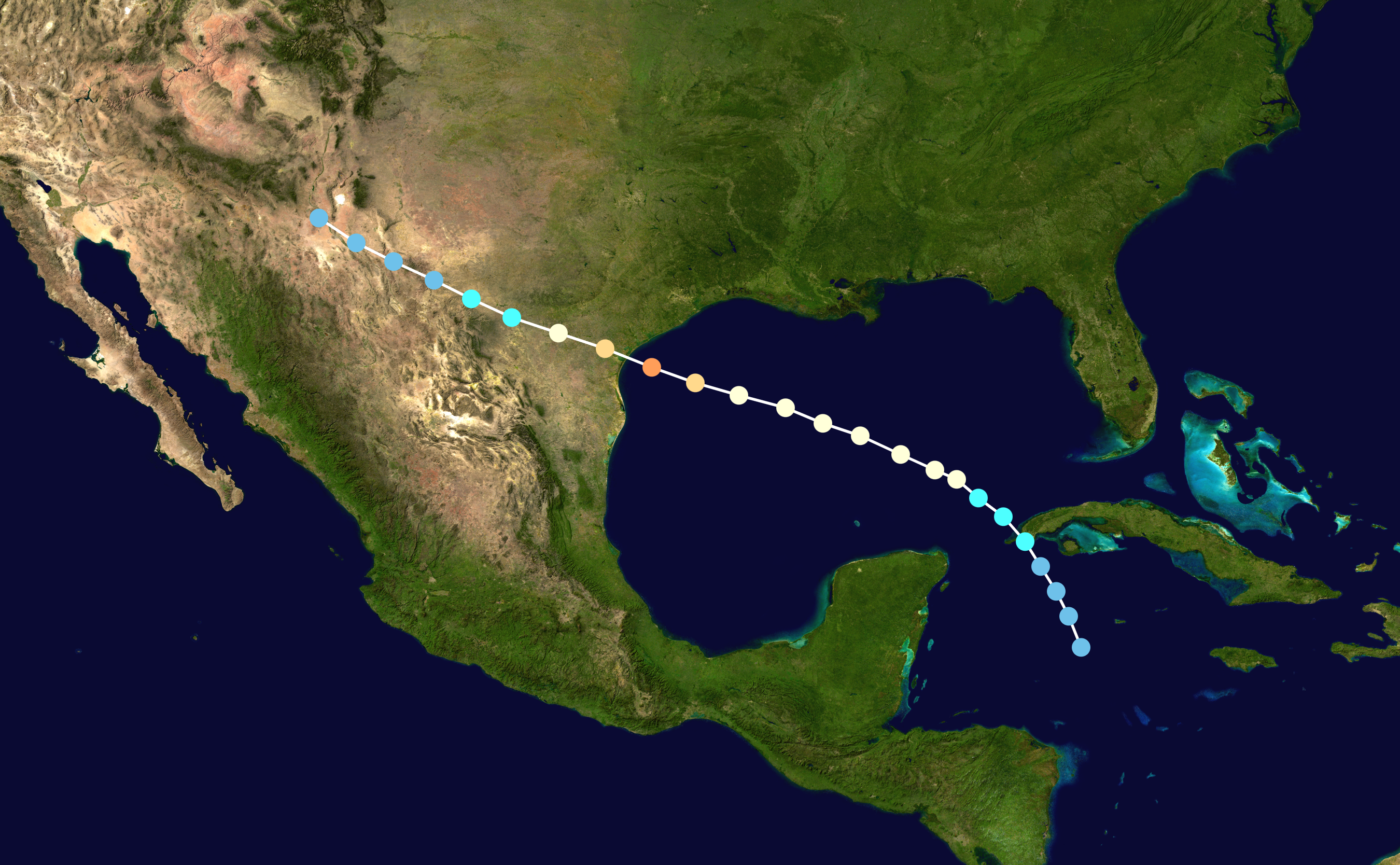
- Duration: July 31 – August 5
- Peak intensity: 140 mph (220 km/h) (1-min); 944 mbar (hPa)

A tropical wave emerged into the Atlantic Ocean from the west coast of Africa on July 23. It moved rapidly westward and reached the western Caribbean Sea by July 30. On the following day, the system developed into a tropical depression near Grand Cayman. The depression tracked north-northwestward and intensified into a tropical storm just prior to crossing far western Cuba on August 1. Due to warm sea surface temperatures, Celia soon intensified into a hurricane late on August 1 over the Gulf of Mexico. However, the storm failed to strengthen beyond Category 1 status until reaching the northwest Gulf of Mexico on August 3. Celia then underwent rapid intensification and at 21:00 UTC, the storm peaked as a Category 4 hurricane with sustained winds of 140 mph (220 km/h) and a minimum pressure of 944 mbar (27.88 inHg) as it made landfall near Corpus Christi, Texas. Celia weakened while moving inland and dissipated over New Mexico late on August 5.

In Cuba, heavy rains on the island caused severe flooding, leading to five fatalities. Storm surge and swells lashed the west coast of Florida, especially the Panhandle. Several life guard rescues occurred, while eight people drowned. In Louisiana, abnormally tides caused minor coastal flooding. The strongest sustained wind speeds in Texas were around 120–130 mph (190–210 km/h), while winds gusts were estimated to have reached as high as 180 mph (290 km/h) in Nueces County. Much of the damage was caused by a series of microbursts and downbursts, most of which occurred in a 15-minute span. Severe damage was reported in Nueces County, with 85% of Celia's total property losses caused in Corpus Christi alone. Approximately 90% of downtown buildings were damaged or destroyed, while about one-third of homes in the city suffered severe impact or were demolished. Throughout the state, 8,950 homes were destroyed and about 55,650 others were damaged. About 252 small businesses, 331 boats, and 310 farm buildings were either damaged or destroyed. In Texas, Celia caused 15 deaths and $930 million in damage.

=== August hurricane ===
- Category 1 hurricane (SSHWS)
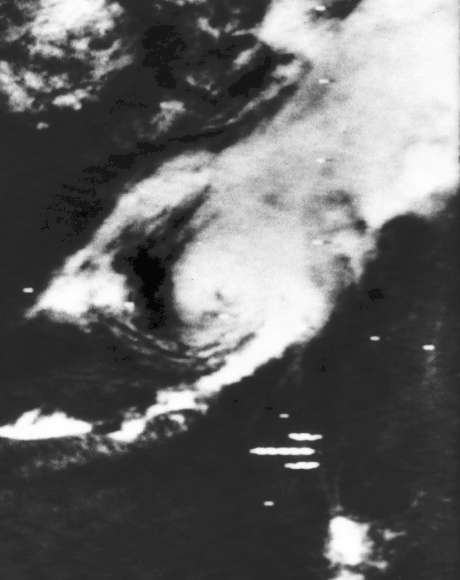
- Duration: August 7 – August 18
- Peak intensity: 80 mph (130 km/h) (1-min); ≤990 mbar (hPa)

A tropical depression developed off the west coast of Africa on August 7, with organized convection and banding features. A day later, the depression passed south of Cabo Verde as it moved across the tropical Atlantic. On August 10, it intensified into a tropical storm, after the thunderstorms became more concentrated. However, a Hurricane Hunters flight two days later observed a weak system, suggesting the storm weakened back to a tropical depression. While approaching the Lesser Antilles, the depression turned to the northwest and re-intensified back into a tropical storm, with hurricane-force wind gusts north of the center. Late on August 14, the circulation opened into a trough. On August 15, a circulation reformed, and the system became a tropical depression again as it bypassed the eastern Bahamas. A day later, the system re-intensified into a compact tropical storm while turning northward. On August 17, the storm made landfalls along the Outer Banks of North Carolina, first on Atlantic Beach and later at Rodanthe. As the storm accelerated northeastward, it intensified into a hurricane, with peak winds of 80 mph (130 km/h), based on the well-defined eye and a report from a nearby ship. On August 18, the system became extratropical south of Newfoundland, and subsequently it slowed and shifted its track back to the south, only to resume an easterly track on August 21. Late on August 24, the former hurricane dissipated north of the Azores.

Along the coast of North Carolina, higher than normal tides capsized about 20 boats, including a 68 ft (21 m) yacht. At Salvo, where the tide may have reached 4 ft (1.2 m) above normal, boardwalks and camping equipment were damaged at the campgrounds. Heavy squalls produced winds as strong as 75 mph (120 km/h) in Atlantic Beach. Minor wind damage was reported in Atlantic Beach and Morehead City, primarily limited to some trees, power lines, roof shingles, television antennas, and signs. From North Carolina to Maryland, lifeguards made dozens of rescues. Four drowning deaths occurred, with two in North Carolina and two in Virginia.

=== Tropical Storm Dorothy ===
- Tropical storm (SSHWS)
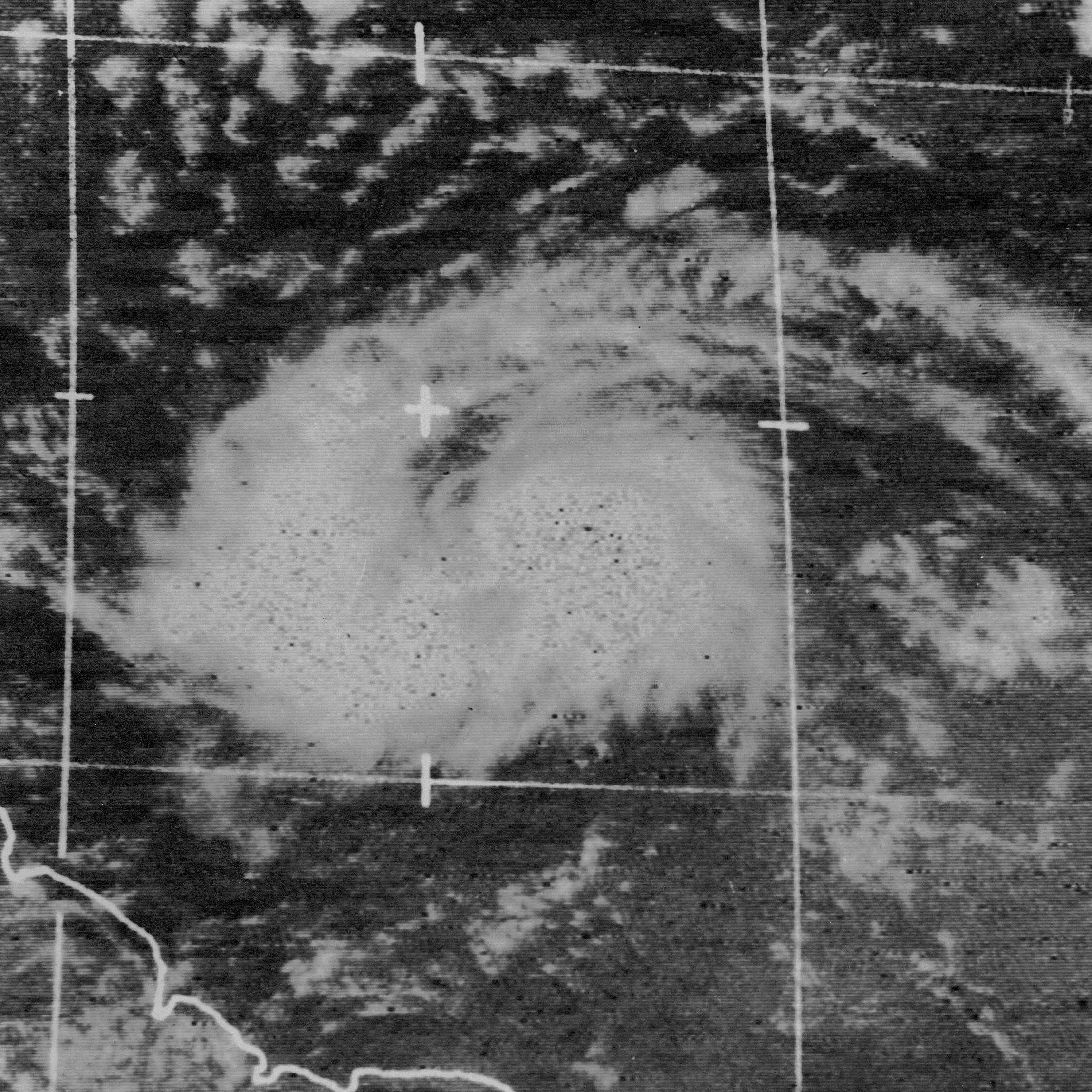
- Duration: August 18 – August 22
- Peak intensity: 70 mph (110 km/h) (1-min); 996 mbar (hPa)

A tropical wave moved off the western coast of Africa on August 13. Moving westward, a tropical disturbance spawned by the wave led to the formation of a tropical depression beginning 500 mi (805 km) east of the Lesser Antilles on August 18. As it moved west-northwestward, it slowly intensified, and was upgraded to Tropical Storm Dorothy several hours later. Around 06:00 UTC on August 20, Dorothy attained its peak intensity with maximum sustained winds of 70 mph (110 km/h), several hours before striking Martinique. After passing through the Lesser Antilles, Dorothy moved under an upper-level cold-core trough, which generated stronger wind shear and caused the storm to weaken. Early on August 22, Dorothy degenerated into a trough south of Puerto Rico.

Throughout the Lesser Antilles, Dorothy produced high winds and heavy rainfall. On Martinique, large amounts of precipitation resulted in flooding and mudslides, which in turn, caused bridge collapses and damage to homes. In addition, strong tropical storm force winds were also reported on the island. The storm destroyed 186 homes and left 700 people homeless. Banana, sugar cane, and other crops sustained heavy losses. Flooding rains also overspread Dominica and Guadeloupe, but with less severe effects. While the exact death toll of Dorothy is unknown, some sources claim that as many as 51 fatalities occurred. Storm damage amounted to $34 million.

=== Early September tropical storm ===
- Tropical storm (SSHWS)
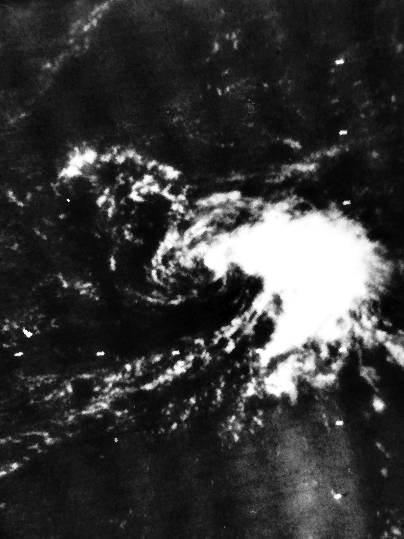
- Duration: September 3 – September 13
- Peak intensity: 45 mph (75 km/h) (1-min); ≤1006 mbar (hPa)

A tropical wave exited the coast of Africa on August 29 and progressed westward, with associated thunderstorms evident on satellite imagery. The system's structure organized, evolving into a tropical depression by September 3. A trough to its north steered the nascent depression northward. Despite the presence of wind shear, the depression intensified as its area of thunderstorms expanded. On September 5, the Hurricane Hunters flew into the system and estimated sustained winds of 45 mph (75 km/h), making it a tropical storm. The continued shear displaced the thunderstorms to the east of the center, as the circulation began moving to the west-southwest. On September 7, the storm weakened back to a tropical depression. On September 11, it passed north of the Lesser Antilles, still as a weak depression. After passing north of Puerto Rico, the depression dissipated on September 13 north of Hispaniola. The remnants continued westward without developing.

=== Hurricane Ella ===
- Category 3 hurricane (SSHWS)
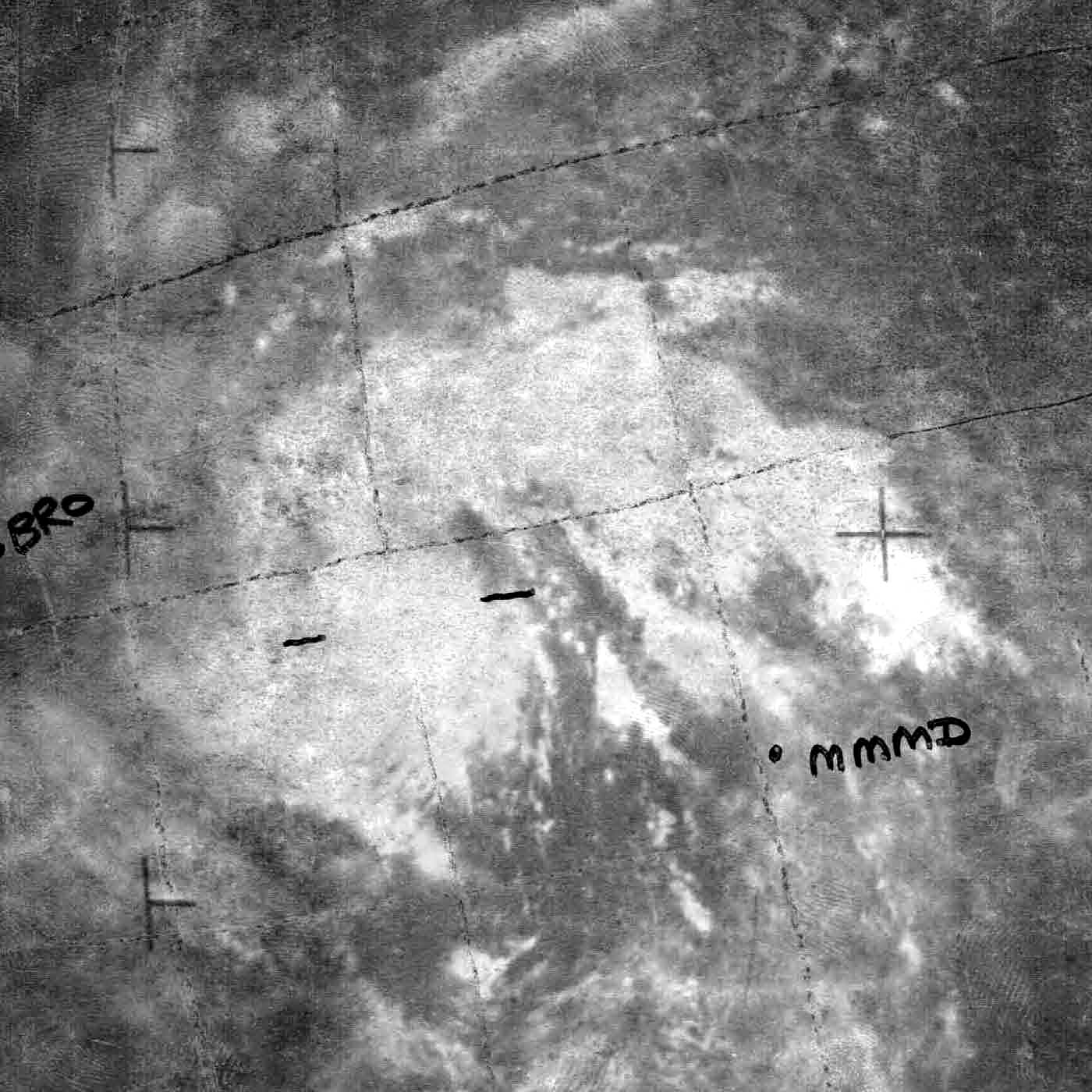
- Duration: September 8 – September 13
- Peak intensity: 125 mph (205 km/h) (1-min); 962 mbar (hPa)

The origins of Hurricane Ella were from a well-defined trough that extended from the San Andres archipelago to Florida in early September. A tropical depression developed from the system on September 8 near Swan Island off the north coast of Honduras. Moving northwestward, the depression failed to strengthen much before striking the Yucatán Peninsula on September 10, just south of Cozumel. As it emerged into the Gulf of Mexico, the depression began to intensify significantly. A few hours later, the Hurricane Hunters observed a tropical storm, which prompted the system being named "Ella". Around that time, the storm started a general curve toward the west, due to a ridge to its north. With an anticyclone aloft providing favorable conditions, Ella rapidly intensified into a hurricane less than 12 hours after emerging from the Yucatán Peninsula. Ella turned to the west as its intensification rate slowed. About 24 hours before its final landfall, its center became trackable on radar from Brownsville, Texas. As the ridge to the north weakened, Ella slowed its forward motion markedly and quickly strengthened. In the 12 hours before moving ashore, the winds increased from 100 mph (160 km/h) to 125 mph (201 km/h), making Ella a major hurricane, or Category 3 on the Saffir-Simpson Hurricane Scale. On September 12, the hurricane made landfall near La Pesca, Tamaulipas, about 150 mi (220 km) south of the Mexico/United States border, with a barometric pressure of 967 mbar (28.6 inHg). It rapidly weakened over land, dissipating early on September 13 over western Nuevo León.

In the Yucatán Peninsula, wind gusts of 55 mph (90 km/h) were observed. In northeast Mexico, the hurricane destroyed several houses, killing a girl in Abasolo. Wind gusts in La Pesco reached 150 mph (240 km/h), and 80 mph (130 km/h) in Ciudad Victoria. Heavy rainfall caused rivers to crest above flood stage. The rainfall disrupted post-storm rescue work by preventing helicopters from delivering relief items. The hurricane increased surf along the Texas coast, with wave heights of 7 ft (2.1 m) observed. Precipitation was light in Texas, peaking at 0.88 in (22 mm) at McAllen.

=== Tropical Storm Felice ===
- Tropical storm (SSHWS)
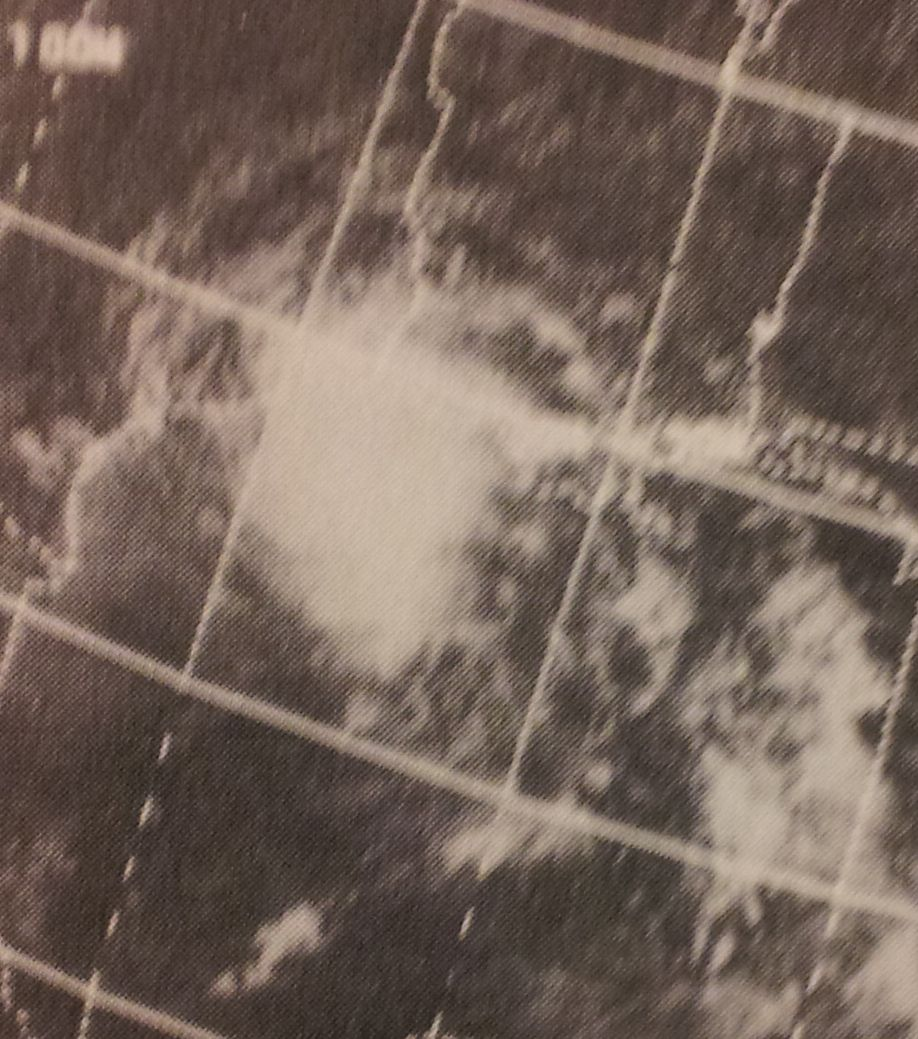
- Duration: September 12 – September 18
- Peak intensity: 70 mph (110 km/h) (1-min); 990 mbar (hPa)

On September 12, a tropical depression developed from an upper-level trough just south of Abaco Islands. Without significant intensification, the system crossed the Florida Keys and entered the Gulf of Mexico. Felice remained a disorganized storm for its entire duration, plagued by dry air, a lack of deep thunderstorm activity, and an ill-defined center of circulation. However, early on September 16, the cyclone peaked with maximum sustained winds of 70 mph (110 km/h) and a minimum barometric pressure of 997 mbar (29.44 inHg). Felice tracked northwestward and brushed southern Louisiana on September 15, before making landfall near Galveston, Texas, later that day. Once ashore, Felice quickly deteriorated as it recurved into the central United States, dissipating on September 18. While over southeastern Oklahoma, however, its remnants still closely resembled a formidable tropical cyclone.

In advance of the cyclone, officials advised residents in vulnerable communities to evacuate their homes, and temporary storm shelters were established. However, the effects from Felice were generally light. Beneficial rains fell over parts of southern Florida, while sections of coastal Louisiana experienced minimal gale-force winds and above-normal tides. In Texas, winds gusting to 55 mph (89 km/h) at Galveston—and estimated near 70 mph (110 km/h) elsewhere—caused scattered power outages and minor tree damage, while heavy rainfall totaling over 6 in (150 mm) triggered some street flooding. Felice delayed the local rice harvest and ruined some hay that had been cut before the storm. Significant precipitation and gusty winds accompanied the system into northern Texas and Oklahoma.

=== Late September tropical storm ===
- Tropical storm (SSHWS)
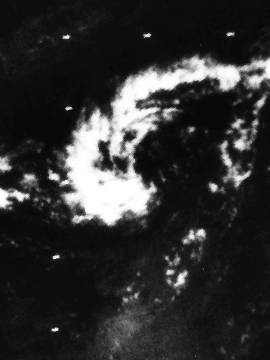
- Duration: September 19 – September 23
- Peak intensity: 45 mph (75 km/h) (1-min); ≤1011 mbar (hPa)

The interaction of a tropical wave and a weakening front spawned an area of disturbed weather northeast of the Leeward Islands on September 18. It organized into a tropical depression by 18:00 UTC on September 19 and further strengthened into a tropical storm 24 hours later. Shortly thereafter, the system reached peak winds of 45 mph (75 km/h) as it maintained compact convection and attendant spiral bands into its center. By September 22, however, the storm became disheveled as its center became exposed west of the thunderstorms; at 00:00 UTC the next day, the storm opened up into a trough.

=== Early October hurricane ===
- Category 1 hurricane (SSHWS)
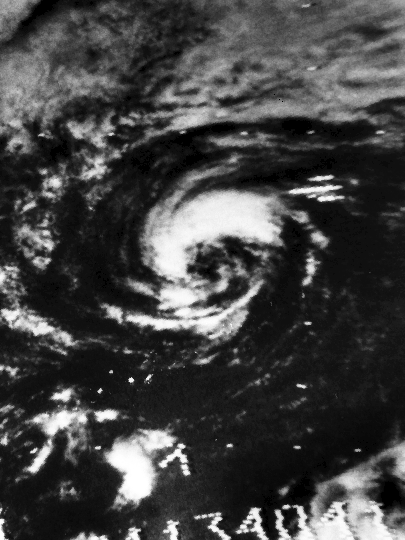
- Duration: September 30 – October 20
- Peak intensity: 85 mph (140 km/h) (1-min); 989 mbar (hPa)

A tropical wave exited the west coast of Africa September 24, and for several days maintained a general westward track. On September 30, a flight from the Hurricane Hunters observed a well-defined circulation, while ships in the area reported gale-force winds; these observations indicated that a tropical storm had developed. The storm moved west-southwestward, passing St. Lucia and St. Vincent into the Caribbean Sea on October 2. It weakened thereafter, briefly degenerating into a trough before redeveloping into a tropical depression on October 5. It re-intensified into a tropical storm as it meandered south of Hispaniola, eventually hitting the Dominican Republic on October 8 as a tropical depression. It crossed the island into the Atlantic and moved northeastward ahead of an approaching cold front, briefly becoming a tropical storm again on October 10. The storm became extratropical as it integrated with the trough on October 11, moving quickly to the east and east-northeast. Thunderstorms increased on October 14, and a day later, the stalled about halfway between the Azores and Madeira due to a ridge over northern Europe. By that time, the system became integrated with an upper-level low while no longer associated with the front; as a result, it became a subtropical storm. Turning back to the west, the storm re-intensified, becoming a fully tropical hurricane on October 17. A day later, it attained peak winds of 85 mph (135 km/h). The hurricane turned to the north, weakening back to a tropical storm on October 20. A day later, it transitioned into an extratropical cyclone, which was absorbed by another cyclone southeast of Greenland on October 22.

The system produced heavy rainfall in the Lesser Antilles, reaching 12 in (300 mm) on Barbados; it left three deaths and moderate damage on the island. Another death was reported in the United States Virgin Islands. Torrential rainfall in Puerto Rico inflicted heavy damage, with precipitation peaking at 41.68 in (1,059 mm) in Jayuya, of which 17 in (430 mm) fell in a 24‑hour period, far exceeding the peak rainfall amounts during the 1928 and 1899 hurricanes. Most of the damage was inflicted to sugar cane and coffee crops. Additionally, at least 600 houses were destroyed and another 1,000 sustained damage, while about 10,000 people were left homeless. The storm affected at least 40 state roads, including 15 blocked by landslides, and 11 bridges destroyed. Overall, damage in Puerto Rico totaled $65 million. At least 18 people were killed on the island, and the system was considered one of the worst disasters in Puerto Rican history.

=== Tropical Storm Greta ===
- Tropical storm (SSHWS)
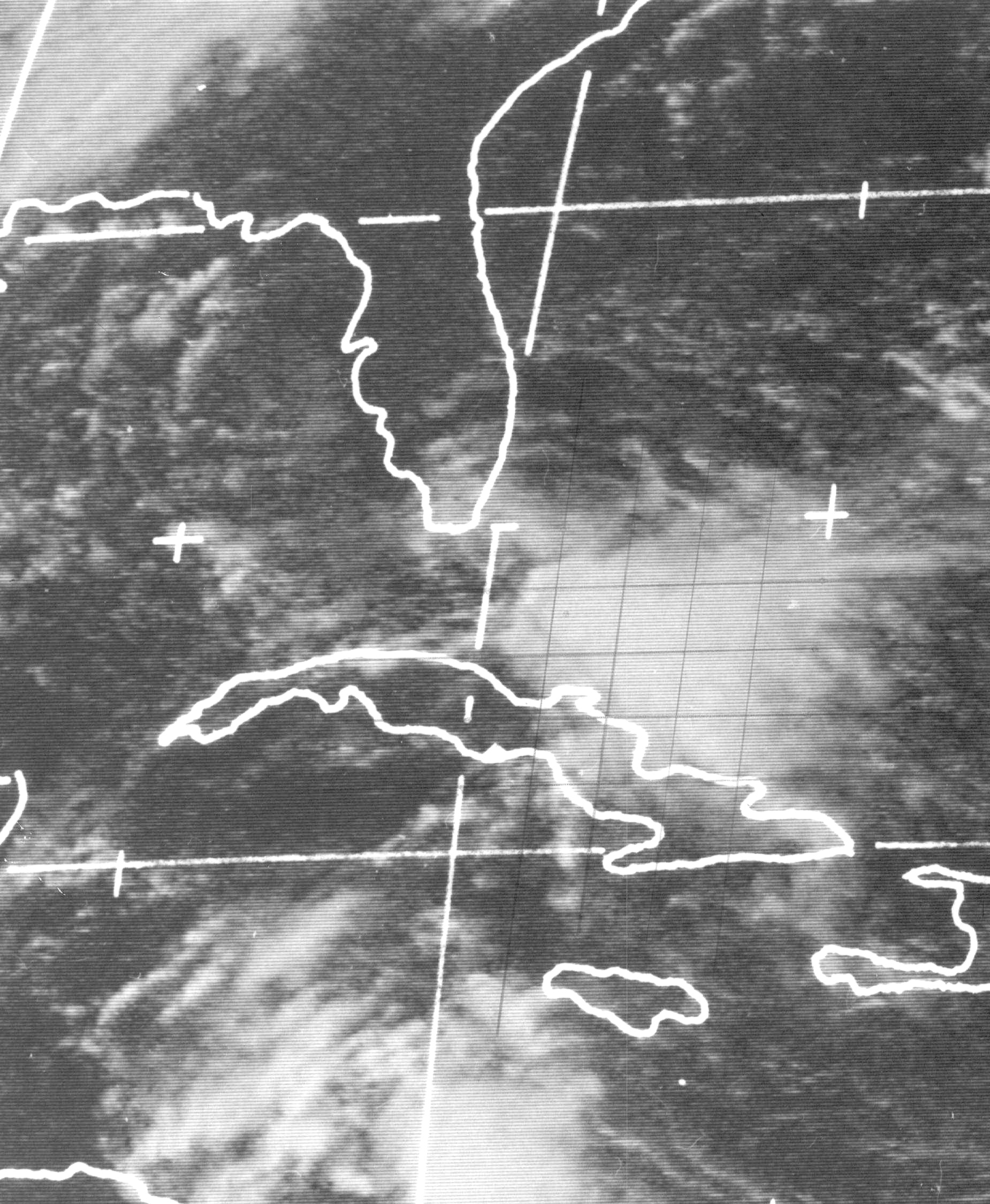
- Duration: September 26 – October 5
- Peak intensity: 45 mph (75 km/h) (1-min); 1003 mbar (hPa)

A tropical wave exited western Africa and emerged into the Atlantic Ocean on September 15. It moved slowly westward until September 22, when a high-pressure area caused it to accelerate west-northwestward towards the Leeward Islands. By the next day, the wave interacted with a cold-core low, producing an area of convection. As the system moved over warmer waters, a surface low formed on September 26. As a result of gale-force winds being observed, the system was then designated as Tropical Storm Greta. However, the storm did not strengthen, despite favorable conditions, and as a result, it was described by the National Hurricane Center (NHC) as a "bomb that did not explode".

While approaching the Florida Keys, Greta abruptly weakened to a tropical depression, coinciding with deterioration of the cloud pattern. In addition, Hurricane Hunters reported rising pressures and lower winds. On the evening of September 27, Greta made landfall in Key West, Florida, with sustained winds of 26 mph (42 km/h). Once in the Gulf of Mexico, Greta did not re-intensify, though it retained a closed circulation while moving around a high-pressure area. It moved across the northern Yucatán Peninsula, though it quickly re-emerged into the Gulf of Mexico. Eventually, Greta made landfall near Tampico, Mexico, on October 5, and dissipated shortly thereafter. Due to the weak nature of the storm, minimal impact was reported. In Florida, tides were generally minor, and were no more than 3 and 4 feet (0.91 and 1.22 m) above normal, as reported in the Florida Keys. Rainfall was mostly light, though 8.94 in (227 mm) of precipitation was observed in Fort Pierce.

=== Mid-October hurricane ===
- Category 2 hurricane (SSHWS)
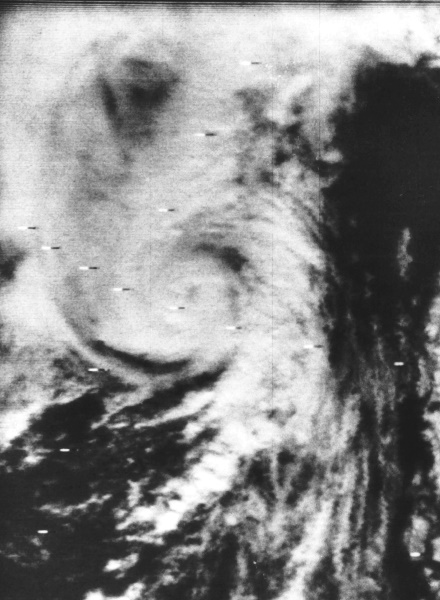
- Duration: October 12 – October 17
- Peak intensity: 105 mph (165 km/h) (1-min); 974 mbar (hPa)

On October 12, a subtropical depression developed while located northeast of the Bahamas. It steadily intensified and became a subtropical storm by the following day. After tracking east-northeastward, the storm made a sharp westward turned, followed by a curve to the north-northeast. After fully acquiring tropical characteristics, the subtropical storm transitioned into a tropical cyclone early on October 16. Twelve hours later, the storm strengthened into a hurricane, shortly before passing near Bermuda. It continued to intensify and briefly became a Category 2 hurricane on October 17. The hurricane then accelerated rapidly northeastward, and made landfall on the Avalon Peninsula of Newfoundland as a Category 1 hurricane. Shortly thereafter, the hurricane transitioned into an extratropical cyclone on October 17.

The hurricane produced high winds on Bermuda, canceling classes, interrupting transportation, and closing businesses, though damage was minimal. In addition, light rain fell on the island. Throughout Newfoundland, hurricane-force winds caused damage to structures, mostly in the form of broken windows. Rough seas along the Atlantic coast of the island damaged fishing dories and a fishing ramp. Heavy rainfall was also reported in some areas of the region, reaching nearly 5 in (130 mm) in Quebec. Damage on the Burin Peninsula was in the thousands of Canadian dollars, although the specific figure is unknown. On the French territory of Saint Pierre and Miquelon, several buildings lost their roof due to high winds.

=== Late October hurricane ===
- Category 2 hurricane (SSHWS)
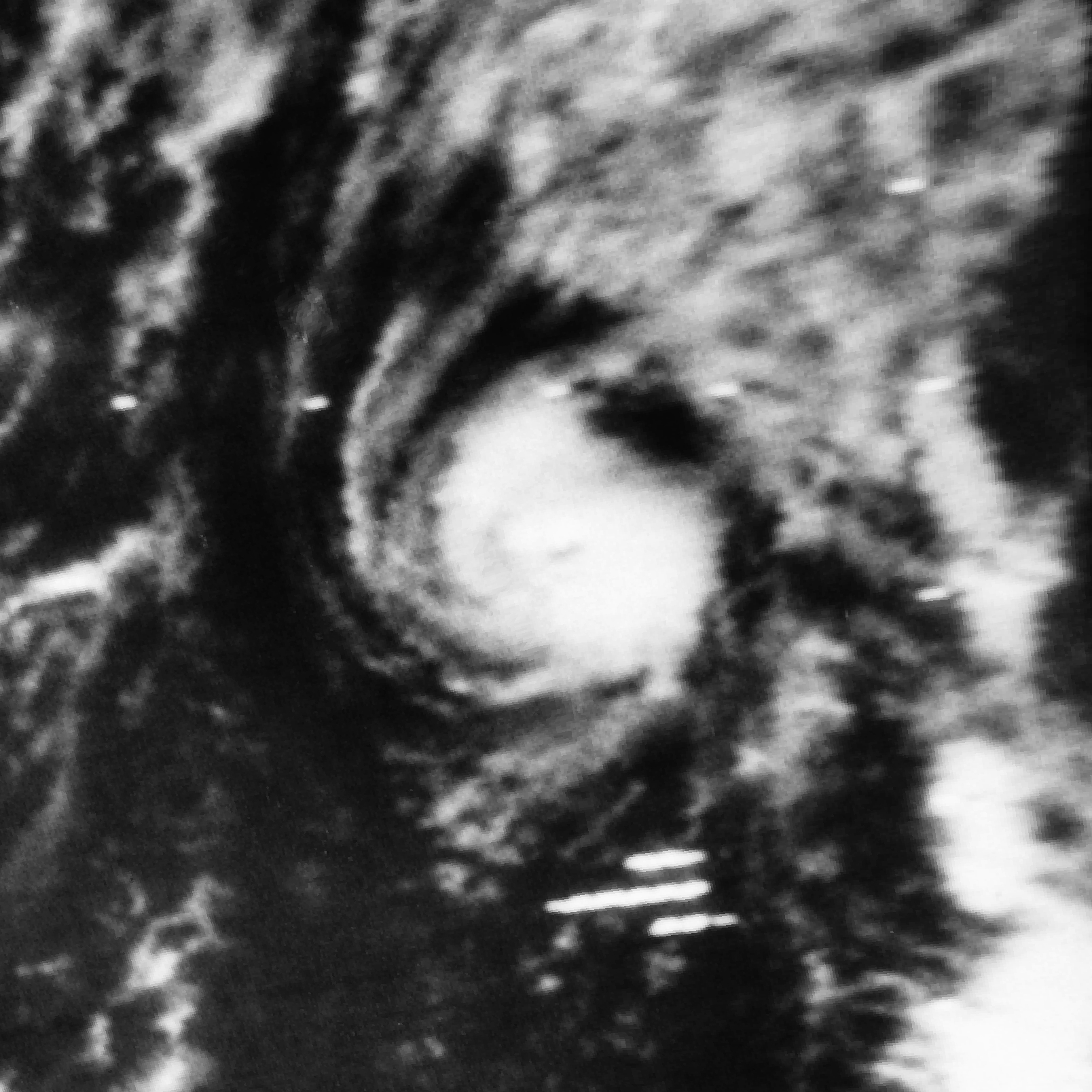
- Duration: October 20 – October 28
- Peak intensity: 100 mph (155 km/h) (1-min); ≤985 mbar (hPa)

A subtropical depression developed about 970 mi (1,560 km) east-northeast of Bermuda at 12:00 UTC on October 20. After intensifying into a subtropical storm early the following day, further strengthening was slow. Initially, the system northeastward, but curved southeastward on October 24. During that time, it began acquiring characteristics of a tropical cyclone, transitioning into a tropical storm at 12:00 UTC. The storm resumed its northeastward motion and continued to intensify. Early on October 27, the storm strengthened into a hurricane. based on a report of winds of 75 mph (120 km/h) from the Pretoria several hours later. At the time of hurricane intensity, it is likely that the hurricane-force wind field was only 6 mi (9.7 km) in radius and its tropical storm force wind field was only 69 mi (111 km) in diameter. By 12:00 UTC on October 27, the cyclone weakened to a tropical storm and began accelerating. About 24 hours later, the system transitioned into an extratropical cyclone while situated approximately 500 mi (800 km) north-northeast of Graciosa in the Azores.

=== November tropical storm ===
- Tropical storm (SSHWS)
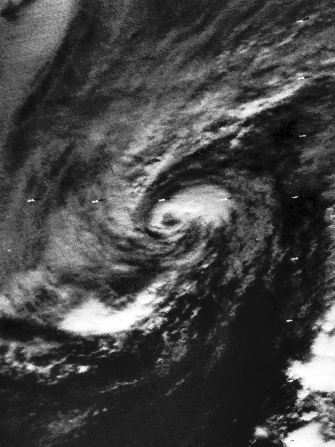
- Duration: November 28 – December 1
- Peak intensity: 65 mph (100 km/h) (1-min); ≤987 mbar (hPa)

Toward the end of November, a cold front moved across the Atlantic Ocean, generating an extratropical storm near Bermuda on November 25. Thunderstorms developed near the center as the system's wind field contracted. On November 27, the storm turned southward toward warmer waters and gradually dissociated itself from the cold front. On November 28, it transitioned into a subtropical storm, as its convection evolved into a comma-like structure. At that time, the system had peak winds of 65 mph (100 km/h). On November 29, the storm turned to the northeast ahead of an approaching cold front. A day later, the system transitioned into a tropical storm, by which time it was a small, well-organized cyclone with convection over the center. Late on December 1, the storm became extratropical again as it became embedded within the cold front. It intensified while accelerating over the north-Atlantic, attaining winds of near hurricane-force. After turning eastward, the powerful extratropical storm passed south of Iceland on December 4, and north of the United Kingdom a day later. The circulation dissipated on December 6 while near Scandinavia.

=== Tropical depressions ===
There were several minor systems that were also classified as depressions by the NHC. A tropical depression developed offshore of North Carolina on July 28. Initially, the depression tracked toward the Outer Banks, but veered east-southeastward and avoided landfall. While nearing Bermuda on July 30, the depression slowly curved north-northeastward. By late on August 1, the depression dissipated while located east of Cape Race, Newfoundland. The system might have briefly become a tropical storm, based on a ship reporting gale-force winds.

A tropical wave moved off the coast of Africa on July 31. It developed into a tropical depression developed on August 2 near Cape Verde. It moved west-northwestward across the eastern-North Atlantic Ocean and eventually curved nearly due eastward. The depression dissipated about halfway between Puerto Rico and the west coast of Africa on August 6. Another tropical depression developed near the African coast on August 11. A day later, it degenerated into a tropical wave, which continued westward across the Atlantic. On August 17, the remnants redeveloped into a tropical depression to the north of the Lesser Antilles. It turned northeastward and encountered wind shear, dissipating again on August 18.

On August 29, convection increased over the western Caribbean as a tropical wave approached the area, which subsequently moved into the Gulf of Mexico. On September 1, a tropical depression developed near the coast of Texas, and at 22:00 UTC, the system moved ashore near Corpus Christi. The depression moved northward, dissipating on September 2.

Another tropical wave exited the coast of Africa on September 4, developing into a tropical depression the next day. The system moved west-southwestward for much of its duration and dissipated by September 7. Later that month, the next system formed just east of Cape Verde on September 22. The depression dissipated on September 25, after moving northwestward across the far eastern Atlantic.

The tail-end of a front dropped into the southern Caribbean during the first week of November. An area of low pressure formed amid widespread thunderstorm activity on November 8, but the system fluctuated in organization over later days as it moved slowly offshore Nicaragua. By 00:00 UTC on November 13, a tropical depression finally formed near San Andrés. The system recurved northeast and reached winds of 35 mph (55 km/h) as it developed some spiral banding features. However, an approaching front moving into the northwestern Caribbean soon imparted shear on the system, causing it to dissipate between Grand Cayman and the Swan Islands early on November 15.

== Storm names ==
The following list of names was used for named tropical storms that formed in the North Atlantic in 1970. This is the same list used in the 1966 season, with the exceptions of Felice and Isabel, which replaced Faith and Inez, respectively. A storm was named Felice for the first time in 1970.

- Alma
- Becky
- Celia
- Dorothy
- Ella
- Felice
- Greta
- Hallie (unused)
- Isabel (unused)
- Judith (unused)
- Kendra (unused)
- Lois (unused)
- Marsha (unused)
- Noreen (unused)
- Orpha (unused)
- Patty (unused)
- Rena (unused)
- Sherry (unused)
- Thora (unused)
- Vicky (unused)
- Wilna (unused)

=== Retirement ===
The name Celia was later retired.

== Season effects ==
This is a table of all of the storms that formed in the 1970 Atlantic hurricane season. It includes their name, duration, peak classification and intensities, areas affected, damage, and death totals. Deaths in parentheses are additional and indirect (an example of an indirect death would be a traffic accident), but were still related to that storm. Damage and deaths include totals while the storm was extratropical, a wave, or a low, and all of the damage figures are in 1970 USD.

Saffir–Simpson scale
TD	TS	C1	C2	C3	C4	C5

1970 North Atlantic tropical cyclone season statistics
Storm name	Dates active	Storm category at peak intensity	Max 1-min wind mph (km/h)	Min. press. (mbar)	Areas affected	Damage (US$)	Deaths	Ref(s).
Alma	May 17–27	Category 1 hurricane	75 (120)	993	Cayman Islands, Jamaica, Cuba, Southeastern United States	Minimal	8	
Becky	July 19–23	Tropical storm	65 (100)	993	Cayman Islands, Jamaica, Cuba, Southeastern United States	$500,000	1	
Three	July 28 – August 1	Tropical depression	30 (45)	1008	None	None	None	
Celia	July 31 – August 5	Category 4 hurricane	140 (220)	944	Cuba, United States Gulf Coast, Northern Mexico, New Mexico	$930 million	28	
Five	August 2–6	Tropical depression	35 (55)	Unknown	None	None	None	
Unnamed	August 7–24	Category 1 hurricane	80 (130)	990	North Carolina, Virginia, Maryland	Minimal	4	
Seven	August 11–18	Tropical depression	35 (55)	Unknown	None	None	None	
Dorothy	August 18–23	Tropical storm	70 (110)	996	Lesser Antilles	$34 million	51	
Unnumbered	September 1–2	Tropical depression	30 (45)	Unknown	None	None	None	
Unnamed	September 3–13	Tropical storm	45 (75)	1006	None	None	None	
Eleven	September 5–7	Tropical depression	30 (4)	Unknown	Cape Verde	None	None	
Ella	September 8–13	Category 3 hurricane	125 (205)	962	Northern Mexico, Texas	Minimal	1	
Felice	September 12–18	Tropical storm	70 (110)	990	U.S. Gulf Coast, Lower Mississippi region	Minimal	None	
Unnamed	September 19–23	Tropical storm	45 (75)	1011	None	None	None	
Fourteen	September 22–25	Tropical depression	30 (45)	Unknown	None	None	None	
Unnamed	September 30 – October 20	Category 1 hurricane	85 (140)	989	Lesser Antilles, Greater Antilles, Azores	$65.5 million	22	
Greta	September 26 – October 4	Tropical storm	45 (75)	1003	Florida, northeastern Mexico	Minimal	None	
Unnamed	October 12–17	Category 2 hurricane	105 (165)	974	Bermuda, Atlantic Canada	Minimal	None	
Unnamed	October 20–28	Category 2 hurricane	100 (160)	988	None	None	None	
Unnumbered	November 13–15	Tropical depression	35 (55)	1005	None	None	None	
Unnamed	November 28 – December 1	Tropical storm	65 (100)	987	None	None	None	
Season aggregates
21 systems	May 17 – December 1		140 (220)	944		$1.03 billion	115	

== See also ==
- 1970 Pacific hurricane season
- 1970 Pacific typhoon season
- 1970 North Indian Ocean cyclone season
- South-West Indian Ocean cyclone seasons: 1969–70, 1970–71
- Australian region cyclone seasons: 1969–70, 1970–71
- South Pacific cyclone seasons: 1969–70, 1970–71
