= 1981 Pacific typhoon season =

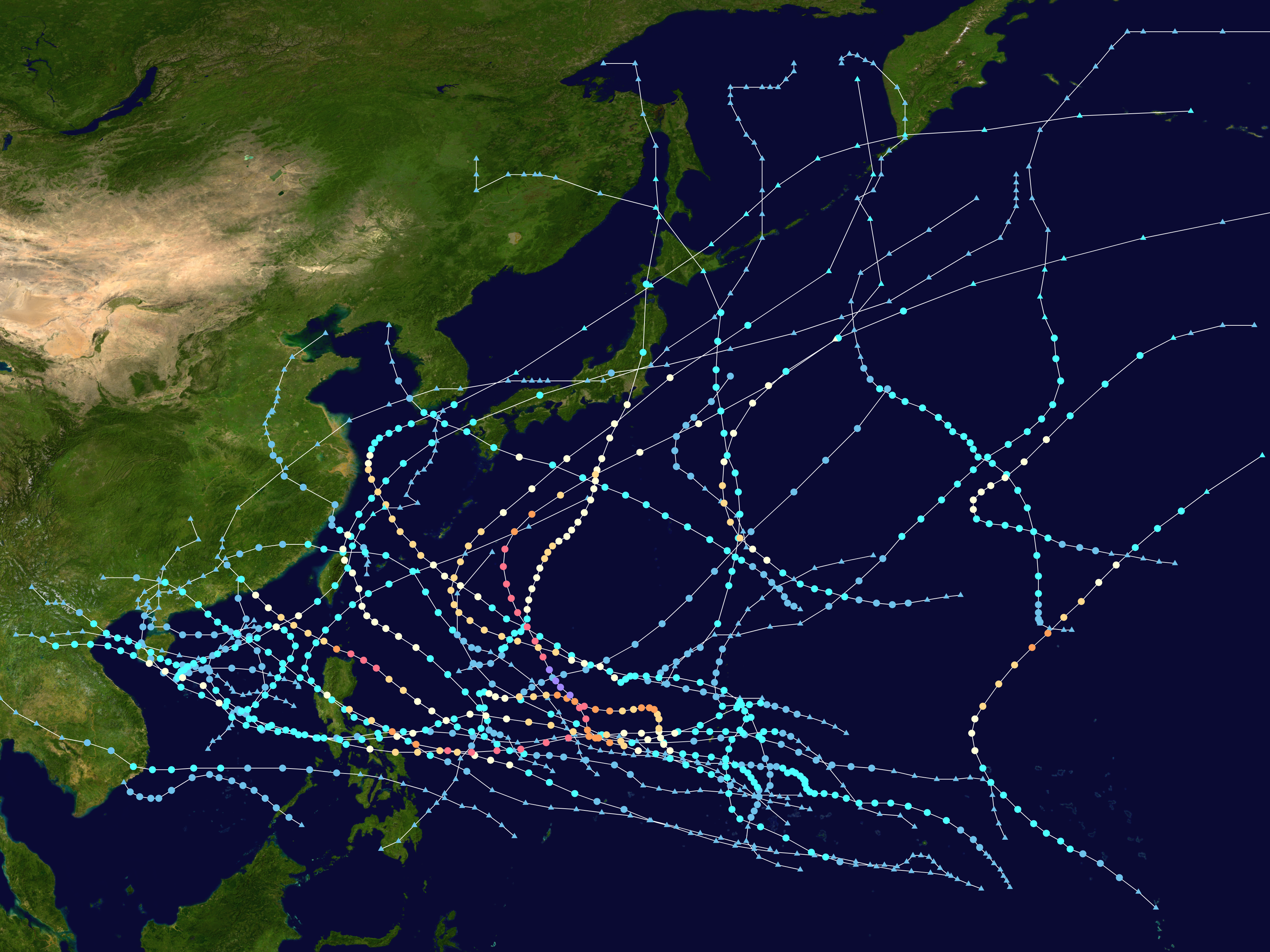
- Season summary map

Seasonal boundaries
- First system formed: February 14, 1981
- Last system dissipated: December 29, 1981

Strongest storm
- Name: Elsie
  - Maximum winds: 220 km/h (140 mph) (10-minute sustained)
  - Lowest pressure: 895 hPa (mbar)

Seasonal statistics
- Total depressions: 52
- Total storms: 29
- Typhoons: 13
- Very strong typhoons: 6
- Violent typhoons: 2
- Total fatalities: >1,268
- Total damage: > $280.2 million (1981 USD)

Related articles
- 1981 Atlantic hurricane season; 1981 Pacific hurricane season; 1981 North Indian Ocean cyclone season

The 1981 Pacific typhoon season was a slightly above average season that produced 29 tropical storms, 13 typhoons and two intense typhoons. The season ran throughout 1981, though most tropical cyclones typically develop between May and November. The season's first named storm, Freda, developed on March 12 while the final storm, Lee, dissipated on December 29. Tropical cyclones only accounted for 12 percent of the rainfall in Hong Kong this season, the lowest percentage for the protectorate since 1972.

The scope of this article is limited to the Pacific Ocean to the north of the equator between 100°E and 180th meridian. Within the northwestern Pacific Ocean, there are two separate agencies that assign names to tropical cyclones which can often result in a cyclone having two names. The Joint Typhoon Warning Center (JTWC) will name a tropical cyclone should it be judged to have 1-minute sustained wind speeds of at least 65 km/h (40 mph) anywhere in the basin, whilst the Philippine Atmospheric, Geophysical and Astronomical Services Administration (PAGASA) assigns names to tropical cyclones which move into or form as a tropical depression in their area of responsibility located between 135°E and 115°E and between 5°N–25°N regardless of whether or not a tropical cyclone has already been given a name by the JTWC. The Japan Meteorological Agency (JMA) also monitors the whole basin and uses the 10-minute sustained wind scale. Moreover, the JTWC also assigns a number with a "W" suffix when a system has strengthened into a tropical depression.

== Season summary ==
The season started with Freda, which became the fourth March typhoon for the basin since 1959. The system passed west of Wake Island before dissipating on March 17. Gerald formed in mid-April near an upper-level low, and recurved just east of Guam bringing the island heavy rainfall. Holly formed in the middle of the tropical Pacific Ocean in late April, and dissipated far from land on May 7. Ike was the first system to form in the South China Sea, living during the second week of June before recurving across Taiwan and becoming an extratropical cyclone. June formed during the third week of June, and moved just east of Taiwan before approaching Japan as a nontropical cyclone. Kelly crossed the Philippines on July 1, moving into Vietnam on July 4. Lynn moved nearby the northern Philippines before making landfall in mainland China on July 7. Maury tracked near Taiwan, China, and eventually Vietnam as a remnant low during the third and fourth weeks of July. Nina formed on the northeast fringe of Maury, also moving into mainland China on July 23, three days after Maury. Ogden moved into Japan at the end of July, approaching Korea early in August.

Tropical Depression 11 formed in the tropical west Pacific, dissipating well east of Asia on August 2. Phyllis formed and remained southeast of Japan on August 3 and August 4. Roy meandered around the South China Sea between August 3 and August 9. Susan moved northwest through the open western Pacific during the second week of August. Thad moved north-northeast through its life cycle, moving through Japan on August 23. Vanessa moved northeast through the open western Pacific in mid-August. Warren moved west-northwest through Hainan Island and northern Vietnam during the third week of August. Agnes moved extremely close to eastern China before dissipating on September 1. Bill recurved southeast of Japan during the first week of September. Clara moved west-northwest near Luzon and into mainland China during the third week of September.

Doyle moved through the central Pacific during the third week of September. Elsie recurved south of Japan during the beginning of October. Fabian moved westward through the Philippines into Vietnam during the second week of October. Gay recurved near the Japanese coast on October 21 and 22. A tropical depression moved west-northwest into Vietnam on November 11. Hazen moved across the Central Philippines into mainland China by November 23. Irma moved across the northern Philippines and then south of Taiwan during late November. Jeff recurved east of mainland Asia during late November. Kit moved erratically westward towards the Philippines during mid-December. Lee moved across the central Philippines, dissipating across the South China Sea on December 28.

== Systems ==
=== Typhoon Freda ===
- Very strong typhoon (JMA)
- Category 3 typhoon (SSHWS)
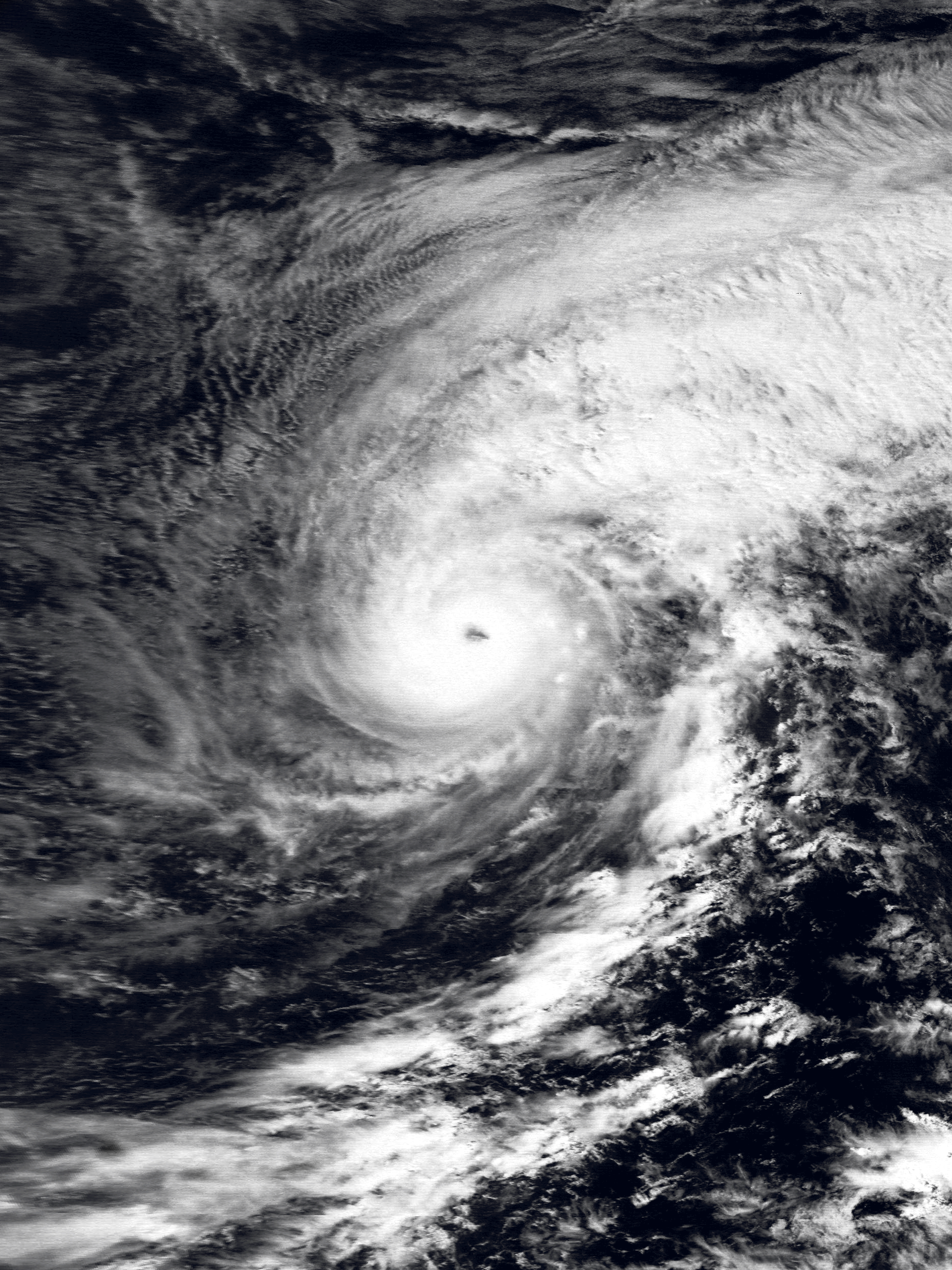
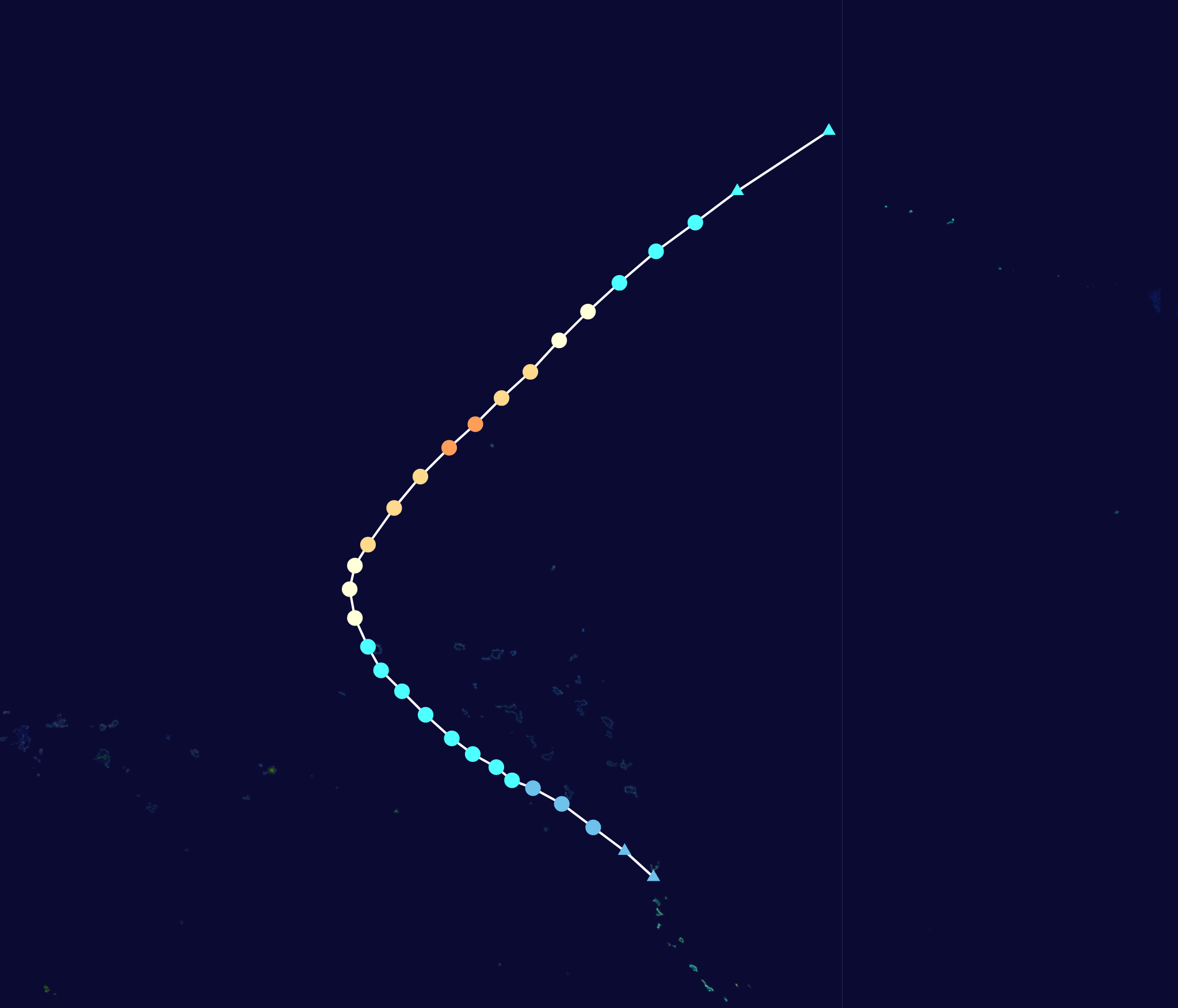
- Duration: March 12 – March 17 (Exited basin)
- Peak intensity: 165 km/h (105 mph) (10-min); 945 hPa (mbar)

Freda was the first tropical cyclone in the western Pacific in 1981 and the fourth typhoon to occur in March since 1959. The incipient disturbance was nearly stationary near the Gilbert Islands for a few days, before drifting northwest and slowly intensifying. During the morning of the March 11 it was upgraded to a tropical depression. It tracked along the periphery of the subtropical ridge with slow development for the next few days. On March 14 intensification became more rapid and Freda became a typhoon. Passing 120 kilometres (75 mi) west of Wake Island with maximum sustained winds of 100 knots (190 km/h) intensity, the island sustained wind gusts to typhoon force and waves to 6 metres (20 ft). As the typhoon moved more northeast, the cyclone weakened, and Freda was absorbed by March 17 into another extratropical cyclone.

=== Severe Tropical Storm Gerald ===
- Severe tropical storm (JMA)
- Tropical storm (SSHWS)
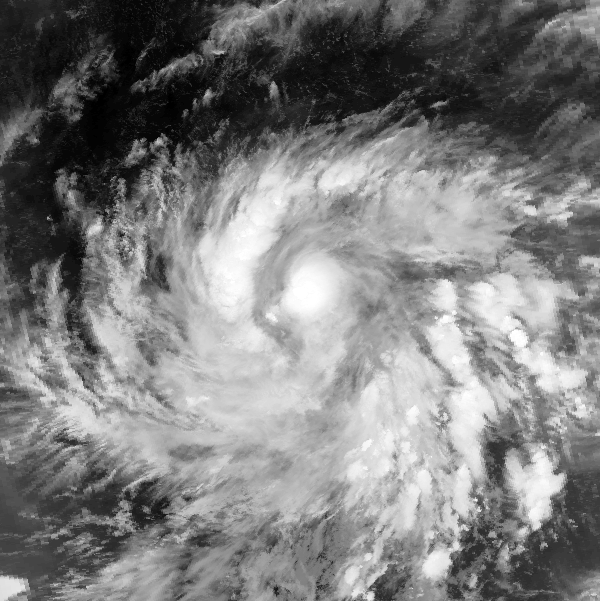
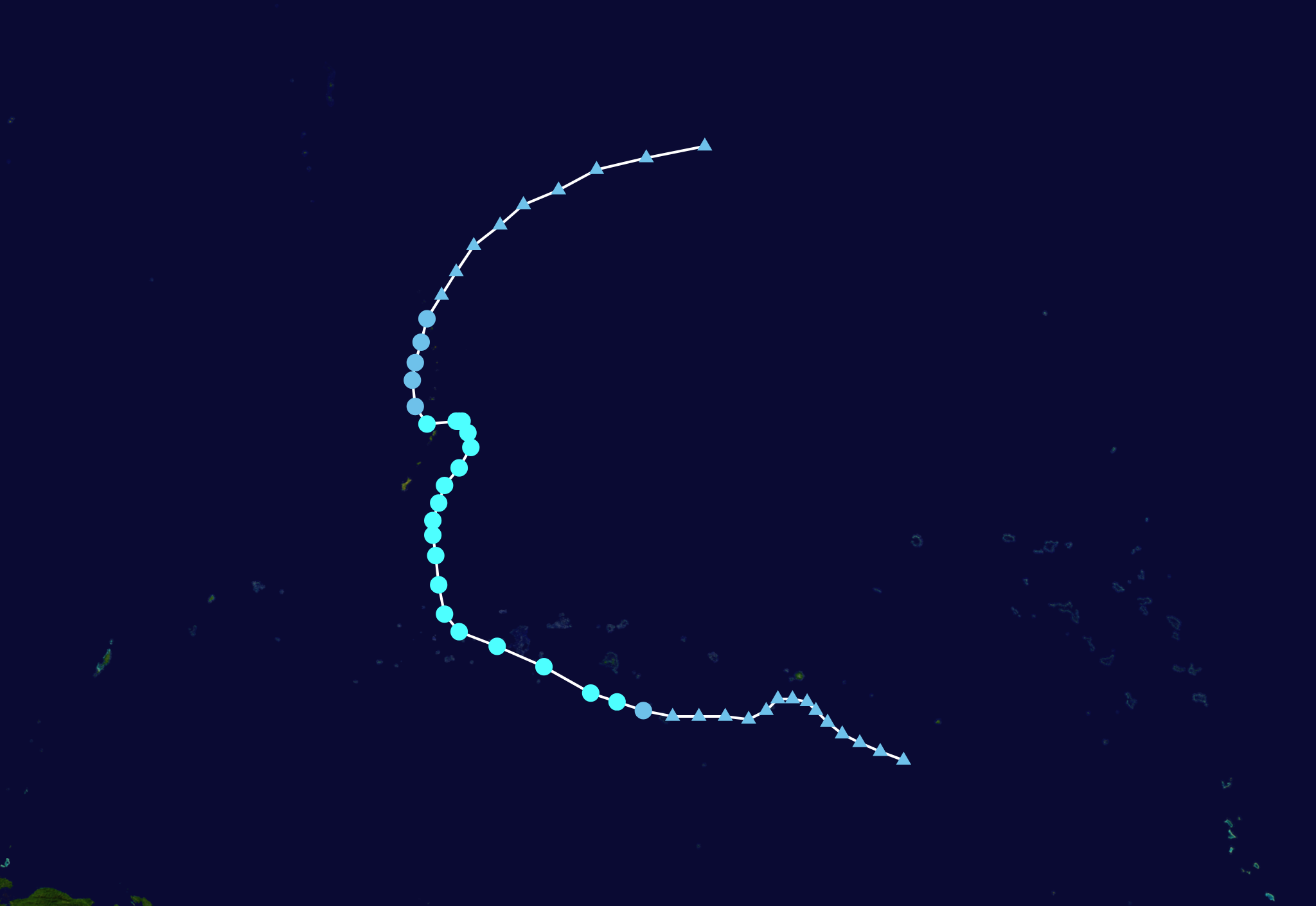
- Duration: April 15 – April 23
- Peak intensity: 110 km/h (70 mph) (10-min); 980 hPa (mbar)

This cyclone initially formed in response to a mid to upper level cyclone southeast of Ponape on April 12. Thunderstorms developed near the upper level system, and an outflow pattern was present on satellite imagery, but a surface circulation did not materialize until April 15. The system became a tropical depression by that night. Steady intensification was seen until around midday on April 17 when a new upper level high formed to its east, inducing southerly vertical wind shear. Weakening began while the storm was located about 130 kilometres (81 mi) east of Guam late on April 18. Moderate to heavy rainfall did occur on the island, with 76.2 millimetres (3.00 in) to 127 millimetres (5.0 in) being measured. After passing Guam, the remaining thunderstorm activity sheared away, leaving a low-level swirl which moved northwest. The cyclone was absorbed by a system approaching in the main belt in the Westerlies on April 19.

=== Tropical Storm Holly ===
- Tropical storm (JMA)
- Tropical storm (SSHWS)
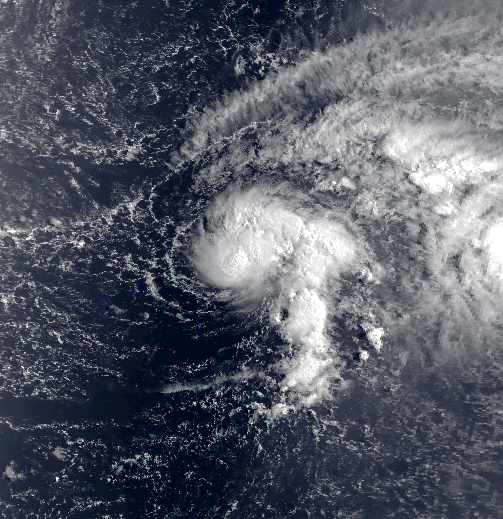
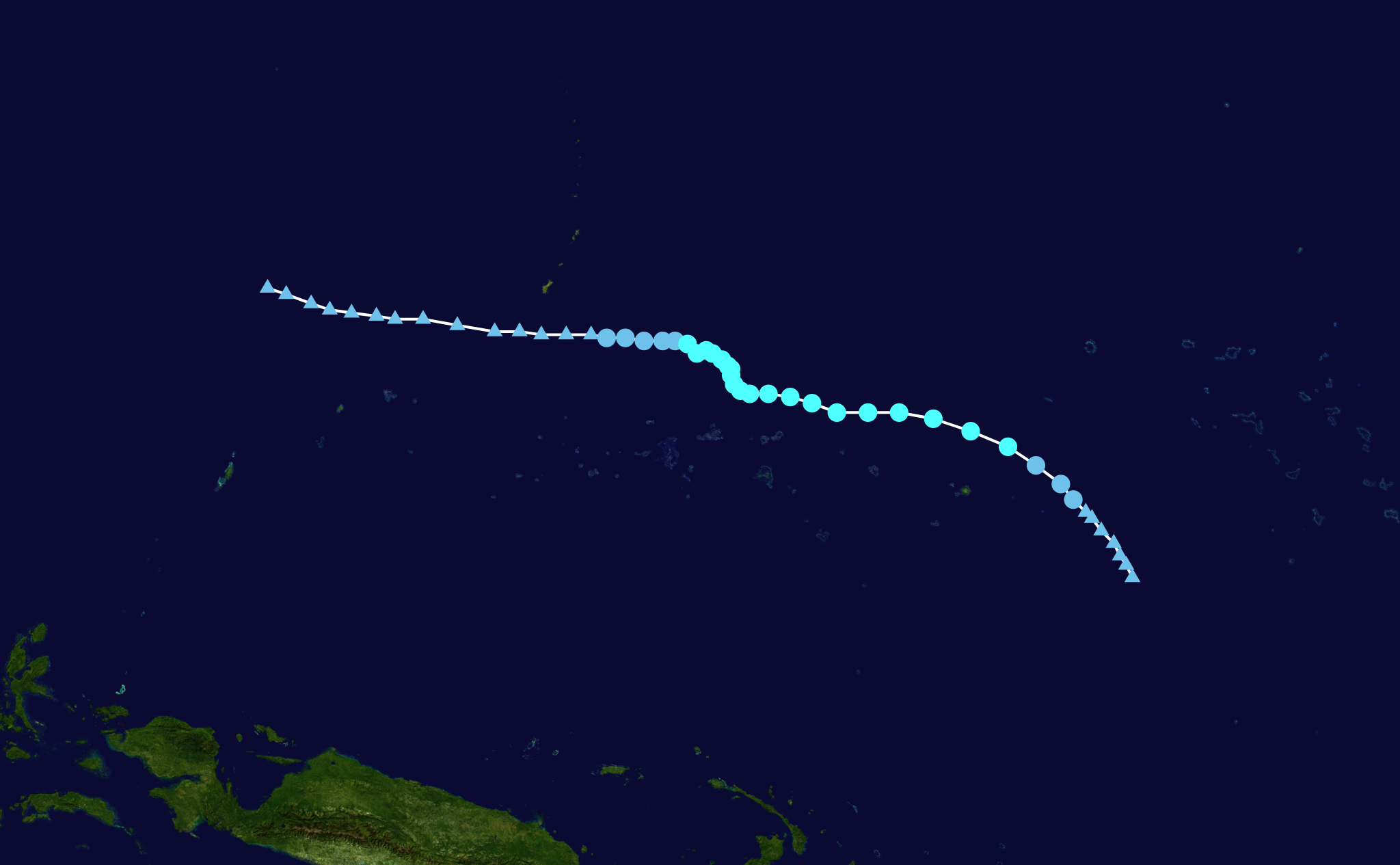
- Duration: April 29 – May 8
- Peak intensity: 85 km/h (50 mph) (10-min); 996 hPa (mbar)

A broad area of thunderstorm straddled the equator around the International Date Line beginning on April 21. A tropical system in the Southern Hemisphere was interacting with a strong system in the main belt of the Westerlies. Around this time, convective increased north of the equator, with a low level circulation forming near 4°N 169°E late on April 25. By midday on April 29 it had become a tropical depression as it continued to move westward. Holly became a tropical storm on April 30 and almost became a typhoon late on May 1. Southwesterly vertical wind shear began to weaken the cyclone thereafter, causing Holly to dissipate over the open Pacific Ocean.

=== Severe Tropical Storm Ike (Bining) ===
- Severe tropical storm (JMA)
- Category 1 typhoon (SSHWS)
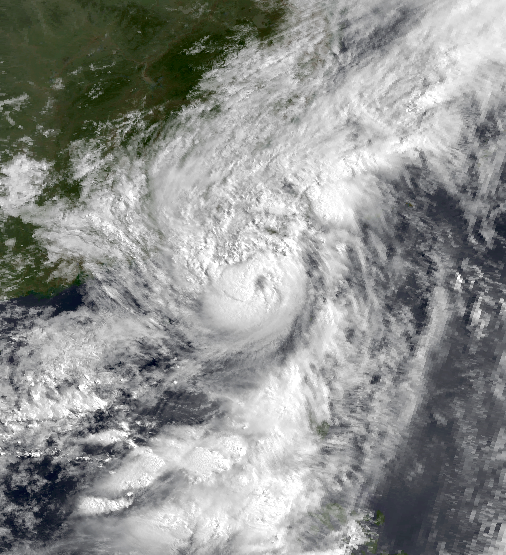
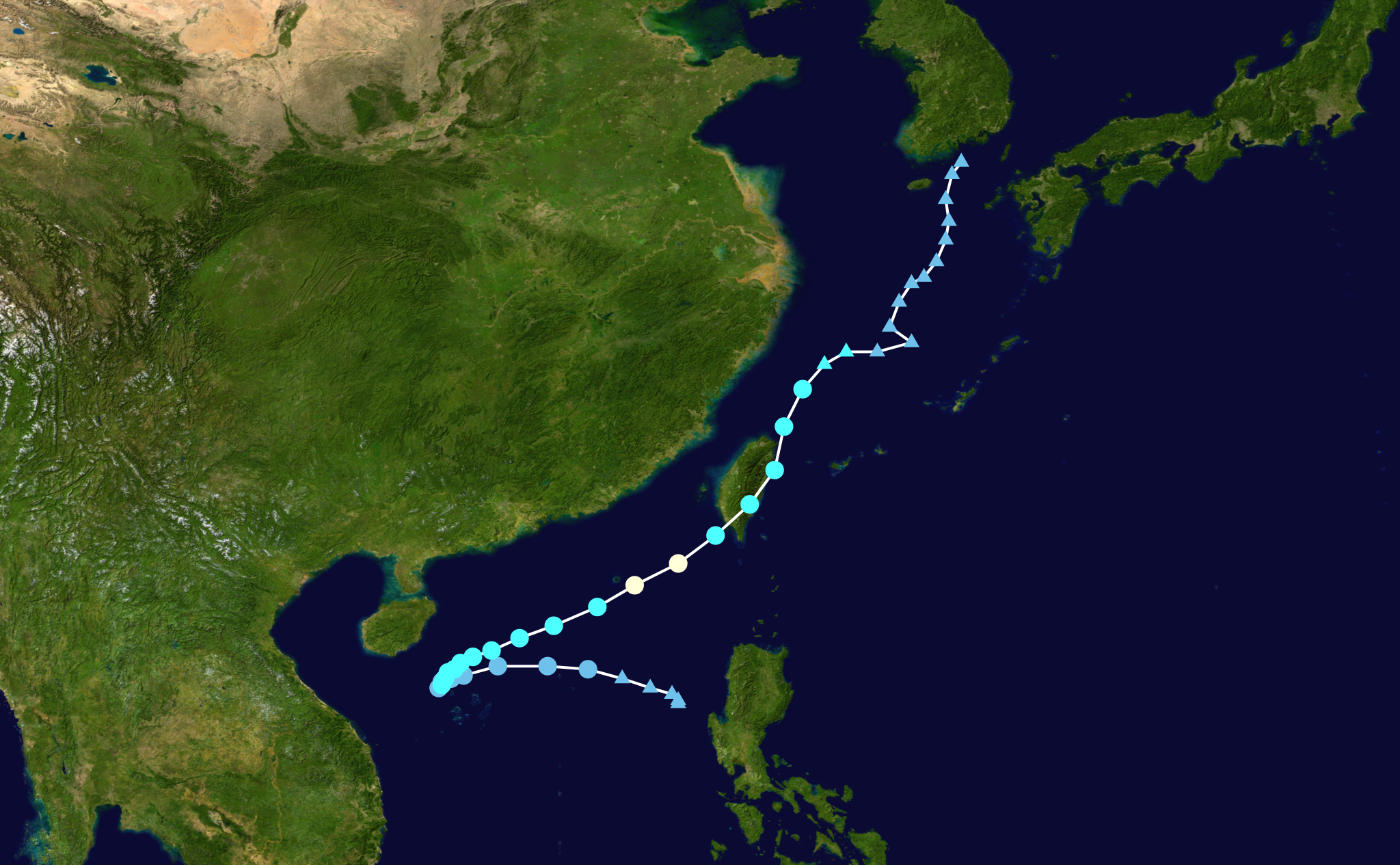
- Duration: June 8 – June 17
- Peak intensity: 110 km/h (70 mph) (10-min); 965 hPa (mbar)

This cyclone formed in the South China Sea at the end of the monsoon transition season. Around noon on June 8 a broad area of lowered pressures was seen west of the Philippines. Moderate northeast wind shear displaced its mid-level center as far as 110 kilometres (68 mi) from the surface center, which retarded development. By midday on June 9, Ike strengthened into a tropical storm. On its closest approach to Hong Kong, winds gusted to 42 knots (78 km/h) at Tate's Cairn.

An upper trough in the main belt of the Westerlies moved across Asia, which turned Ike to the northeast. Intensification continued as it accelerated, and Ike became a typhoon late on June 12. The cyclone reached its peak intensity as it made landfall on the island of Taiwan. Weakening substantially over the mountainous island, Ike attempted slight tropical redevelopment before it became an extratropical cyclone late on the morning of June 14. Eight perished due to Ike, four from Taiwan and four from the Philippines.

=== Typhoon June (Kuring) ===
- Typhoon (JMA)
- Category 1 typhoon (SSHWS)
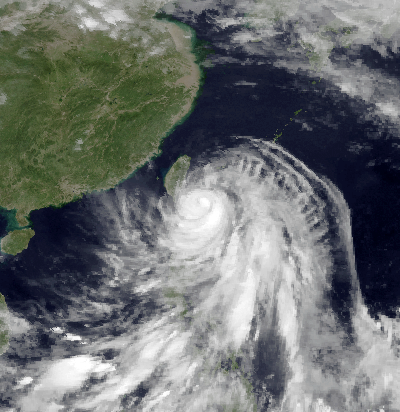
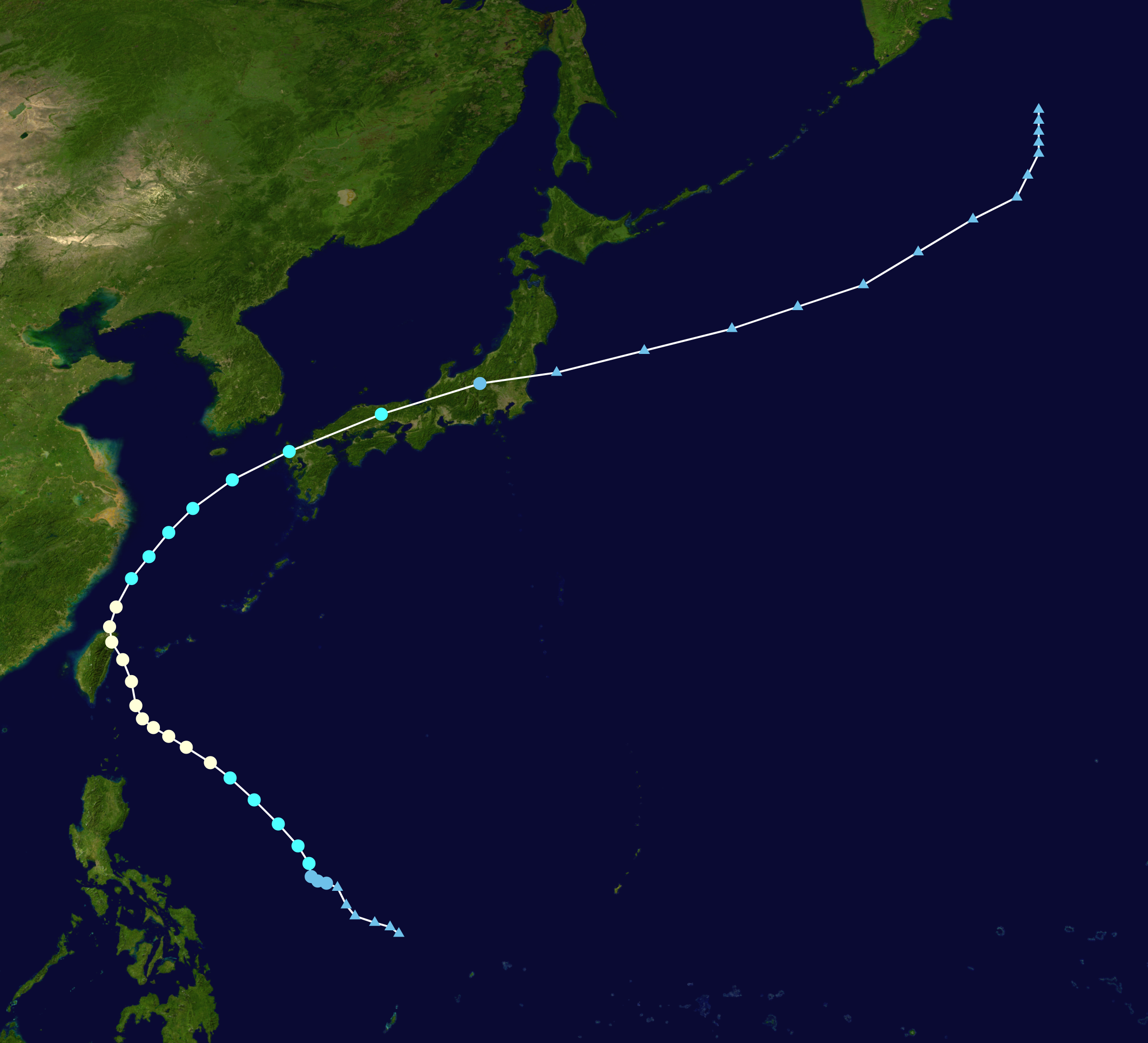
- Duration: June 15 – June 23
- Peak intensity: 130 km/h (80 mph) (10-min); 965 hPa (mbar)

A tropical upper tropospheric trough (TUTT) was located over the Philippine Sea early in June. In response, a tropical disturbance formed in Palau. An upper cyclone to the disturbance's northeast led to development of the disturbance. As the TUTT cell moved to the disturbance's northwest, intensification sped up and a low level circulation center formed on June 15 about 320 kilometres (200 mi) north of Palau. By the afternoon of June 17, the cyclone had become a tropical storm. June tracked northwest towards Taiwan, and by late on June 19, had reached its maximum intensity as a typhoon. About 75 kilometres (47 mi) southeast of Taipei, June recurved to the north, and gradually weakened. While approaching Japan, the cyclone linked up with a frontal boundary and became an extratropical cyclone late on June 22.

=== Severe Tropical Storm Kelly (Daling) ===
- Severe tropical storm (JMA)
- Category 1 typhoon (SSHWS)
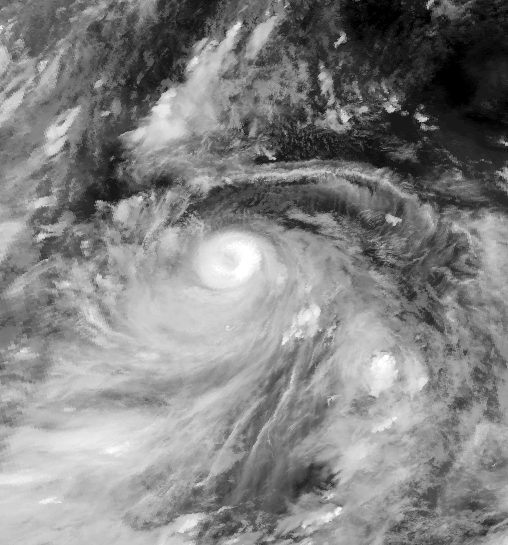
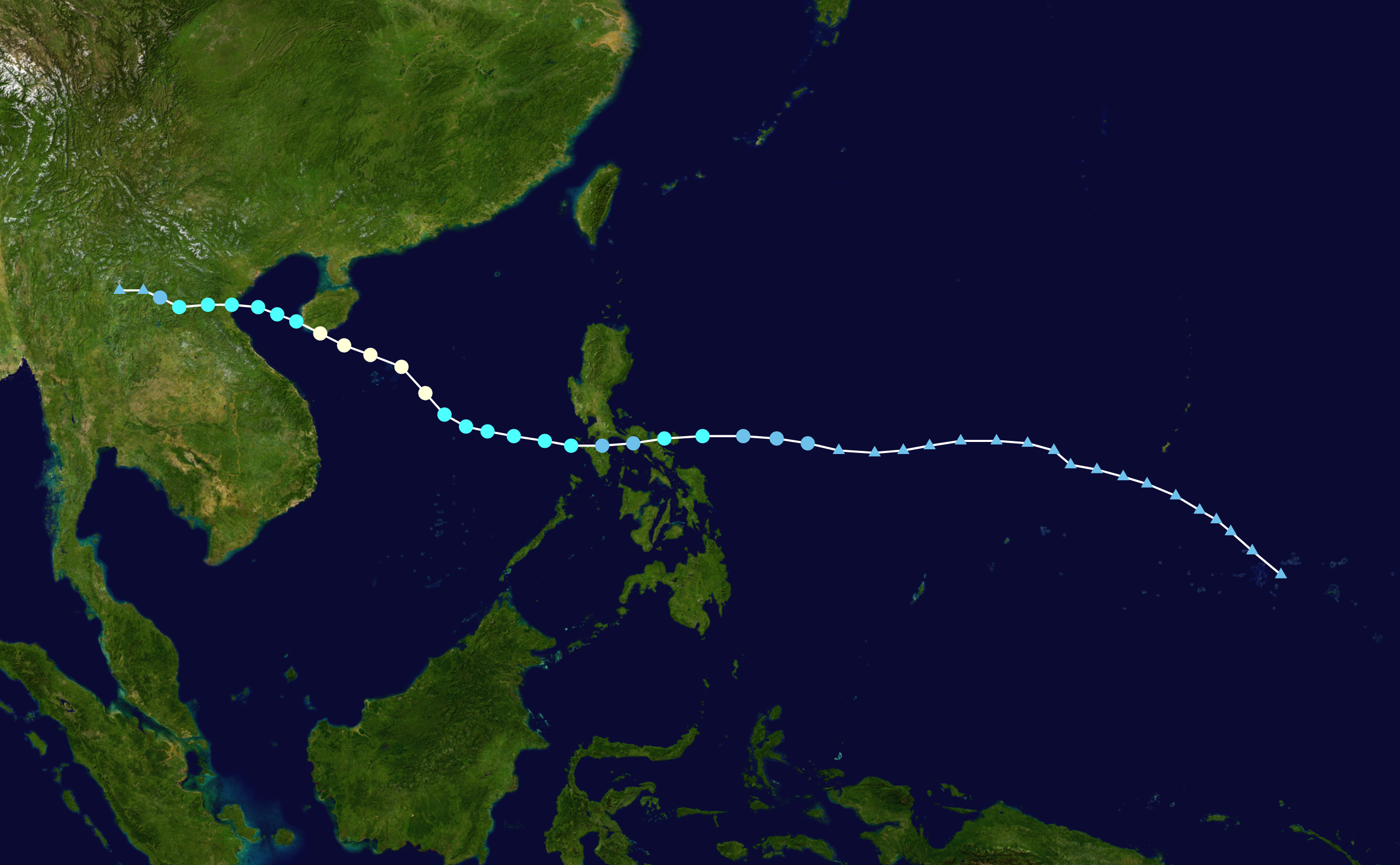
- Duration: June 27 – July 6
- Peak intensity: 110 km/h (70 mph) (10-min); 975 hPa (mbar)

A tropical disturbance organized into a tropical depression east of the Philippines on June 28. It tracked westward, reaching tropical storm on June 30 before hitting the central Philippines. Kelly weakened over the islands, but restrengthened in the South China Sea, attaining typhoon status on July 2. The typhoon hit southern Hainan Island on July 3, bringing wind gusts to 54 knots (100 km/h) at Tate's Cairn in Hong Kong. The cyclone then crossed the Gulf of Tonkin as a weakening tropical storm, and made landfall on northern Vietnam on July 4 as a tropical storm with maximum sustained winds of 35 knots (65 km/h). The lowest atmospheric pressure recorded on July 5 (UTC+7), observed in Vinh at an elevation of 6 meters above sea level, was 985.2 hPa (29.09 inHg). Kelly dissipated the next day, after causing torrential flooding and mudslides, resulting in 200 casualties and leaving thousands homeless.

=== Severe Tropical Storm Lynn (Elang) ===
- Severe tropical storm (JMA)
- Tropical storm (SSHWS)
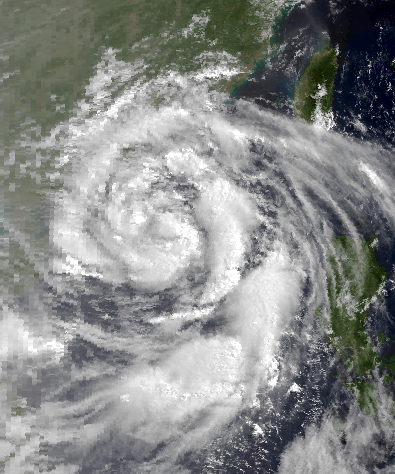
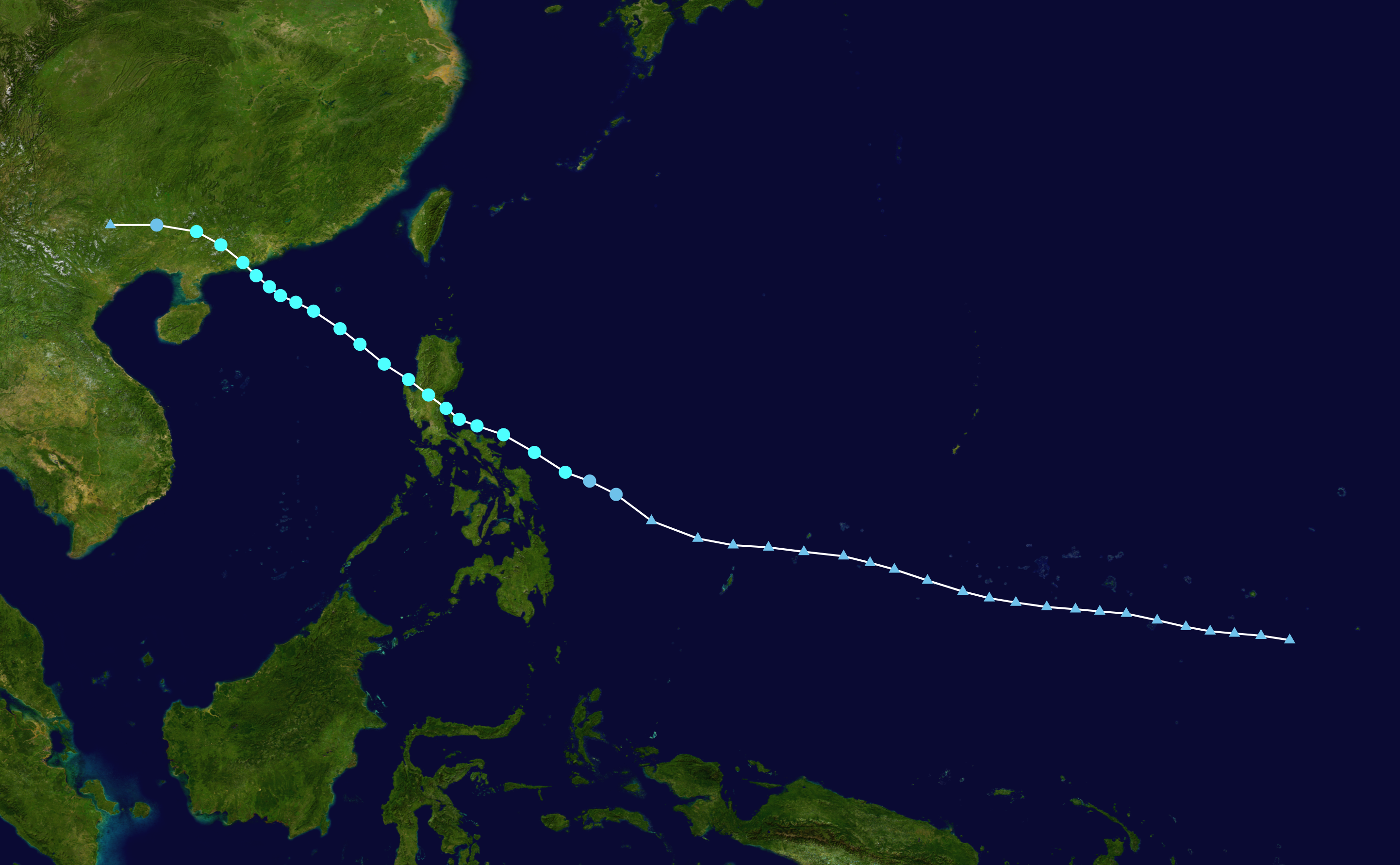
- Duration: July 2 – July 7
- Peak intensity: 100 km/h (65 mph) (10-min); 985 hPa (mbar)

On the morning of June 27, an area of enhanced thunderstorm activity was spotted just south of Ponape along a weak portion of the monsoon trough. As Tropical Storm Kelly led to some vertical wind shear over the system, the disturbance was slow to organize. A low-pressure area formed late on June 29. By late on July 2, Kelly's negative influence on the disturbance abated, allowing for further development. Early on July 3, the system developed into a tropical depression, and by afternoon Lynn was a tropical storm. Previously moving at a fast pace to the west, the cyclone slowed as it passed by the northern fringe of the Philippines. Inflow from the South China Sea led to convection focusing in the terrain of the Philippines, which distorted Lynn's convective pattern. Lynn was the second tropical cyclone is three days to impact the Philippines. The cyclone took 30 hours to track across the northern portion of the archipelago.

It took until late on July 4 for the storm to recover from its Philippine interaction and redevelop a central dense overcast and quicken its pace to the west across Luzon. Turning northwest across the South China Sea, light to moderate easterly wind shear prevented Lynn's development into a typhoon. The cyclone struck Chuan-Tao, China early on July 7. Very heavy rainfall led to mudslides which took 22 lives and left tens of thousands homeless. In Hong Kong, winds gusted to 78 knots (144 km/h) at Tai O, and a total of 118.0 millimetres (4.65 in) of rainfall was recorded at Cheung Chau. Severe Tropical Storm Lynn had the Hong Kong observatory put the Typhoon 8 signal up for 28 Hours and 45 minutes.

=== Severe Tropical Storm Maury (Huling) ===
- Severe tropical storm (JMA)
- Tropical storm (SSHWS)
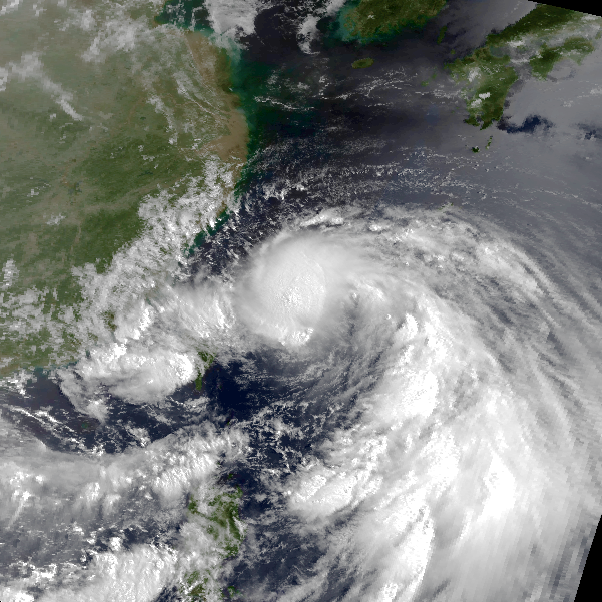
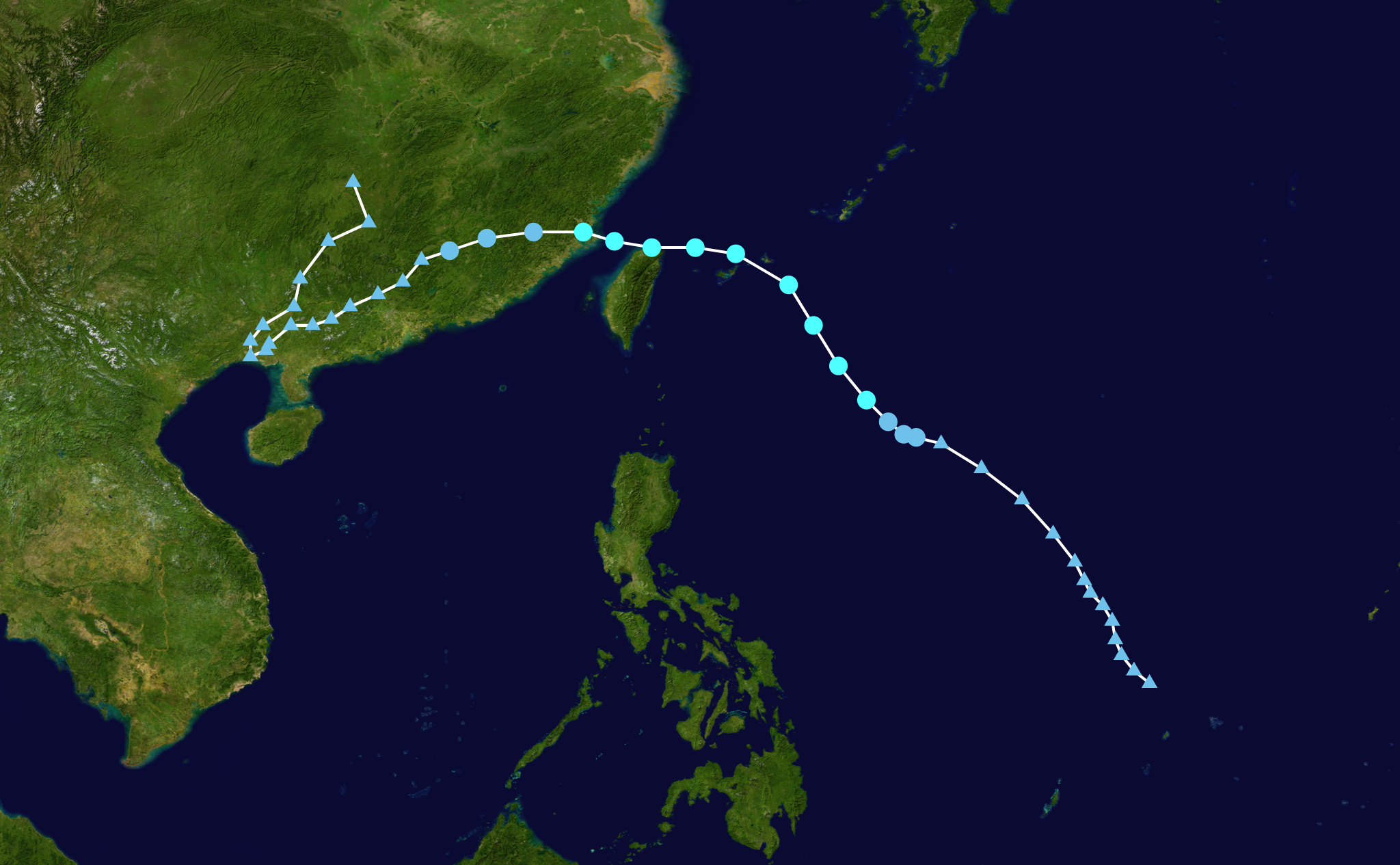
- Duration: July 17 – July 21
- Peak intensity: 95 km/h (60 mph) (10-min); 985 hPa (mbar)

On the morning of July 14, satellite imagery revealed an area of convection about 205 kilometres (127 mi) north-northwest of Yap. By late on July 16, a mid-level center has formed in association with the thunderstorm complex, which was moving northwest. Ship reports indicated the system had become a tropical storm by the morning of July 18. Southwesterly vertical wind shear impacted Maury, which led to its tilting to the northeast with height. By early on July 19 the wind shear lessened, and the cyclone's structure improved. While approaching China, a strong ridge to its northwest deflected the storm on a more westerly heading, sending the center toward Taiwan. This ridge also led to weak east-northeasterly vertical wind shear, which halted development. By late on July 19, the cyclone's center moved ashore northern Taiwan. Heavy rains led to significant flooding and the loss of 38 lives. Maury caused ¥41,000 (US$24,000) in damage. Moving through the Formosa Strait as a weak tropical storm, Maury made a second landfall near Fu-Chou, China on the morning of July 20. Its remains were dragged southwest by an upper cyclone to its southeast back into the Gulf of Tonkin. By late on July 23, the circulation center moved back to the north near Yin-Chou, China and dissipated inland late on July 24. Its former thunderstorm activity decoupled from the surface center while still offshore and moved inland near Nam Định, Vietnam before dissipating over Laos late on July 24.

=== Tropical Storm Nina (Ibiang) ===
- Tropical storm (JMA)
- Tropical storm (SSHWS)
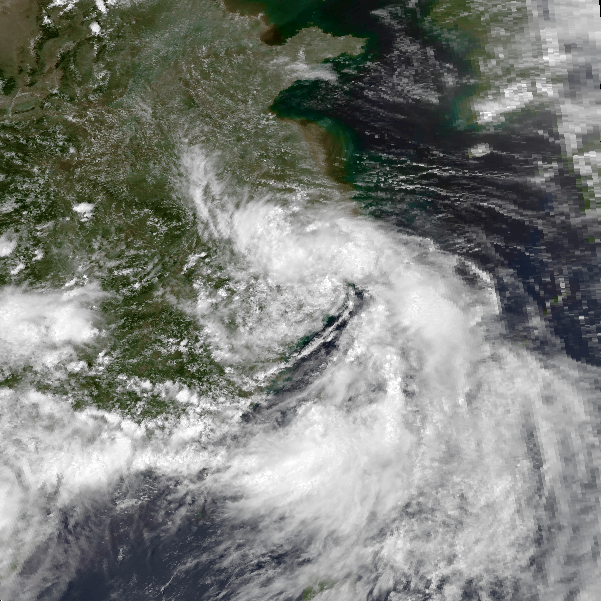
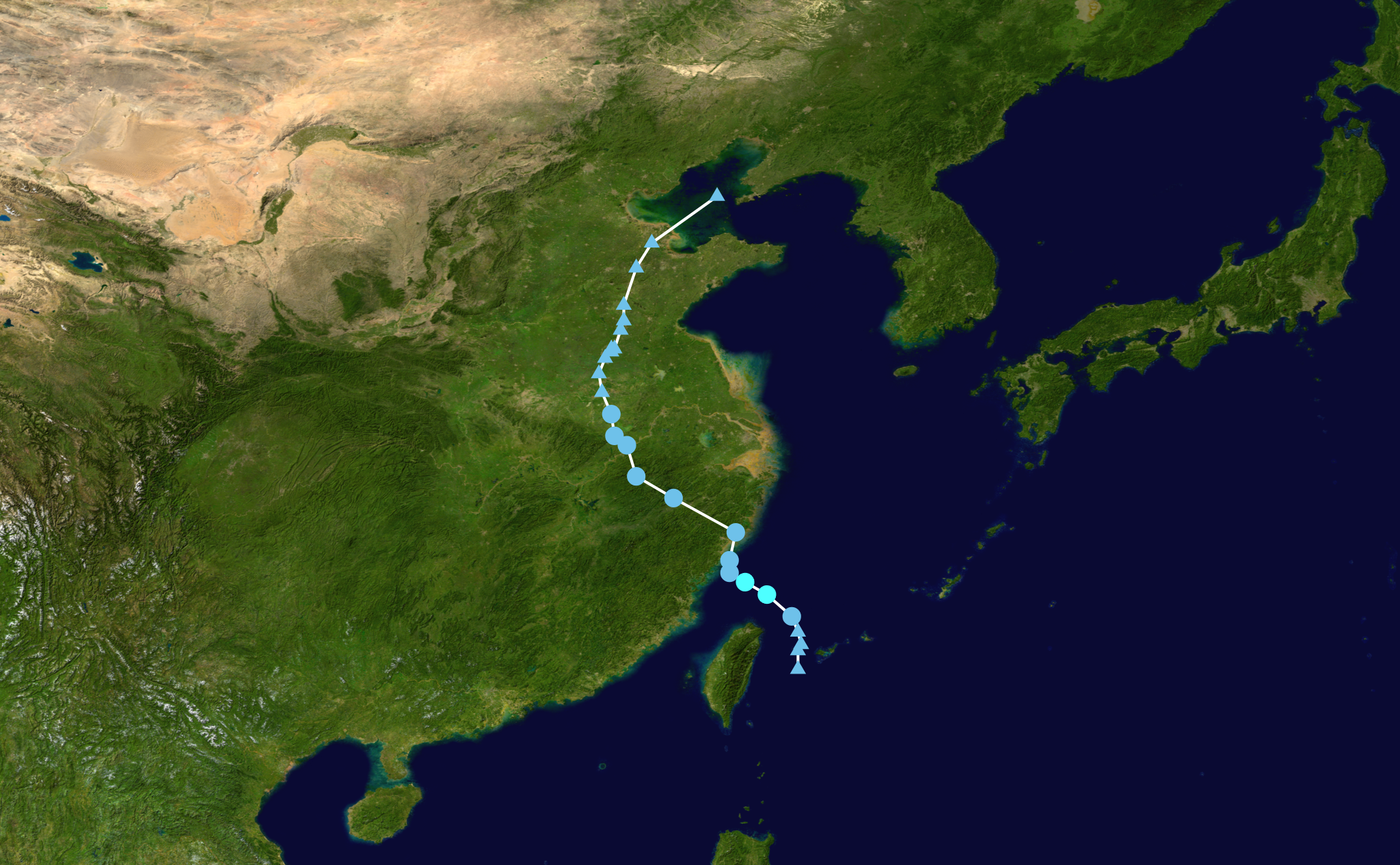
- Duration: July 21 – July 24
- Peak intensity: 75 km/h (45 mph) (10-min); 992 hPa (mbar)

The eastern portion of the large convective mass from Maury led to Nina's formation. It was first noted late on July 20 to the east of Taiwan. As it moved northwest around northern Taiwan late on the morning of July 22. By late afternoon a surface low formed with enough convective activity to be designated a tropical depression. Moving northwest at 12 knots (22 km/h), the cyclone briefly became a tropical storm before nearly land and weakening back into a tropical depression. Early on the morning of July 23, its center made landfall northwest of Hsia-p'u, China before quickly dissipating in mountainous terrain inland.

=== Severe Tropical Storm Ogden ===
- Severe tropical storm (JMA)
- Category 1 typhoon (SSHWS)
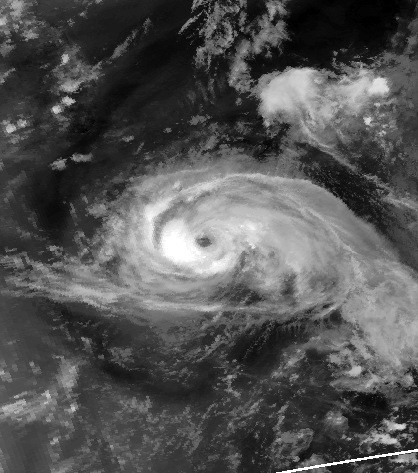
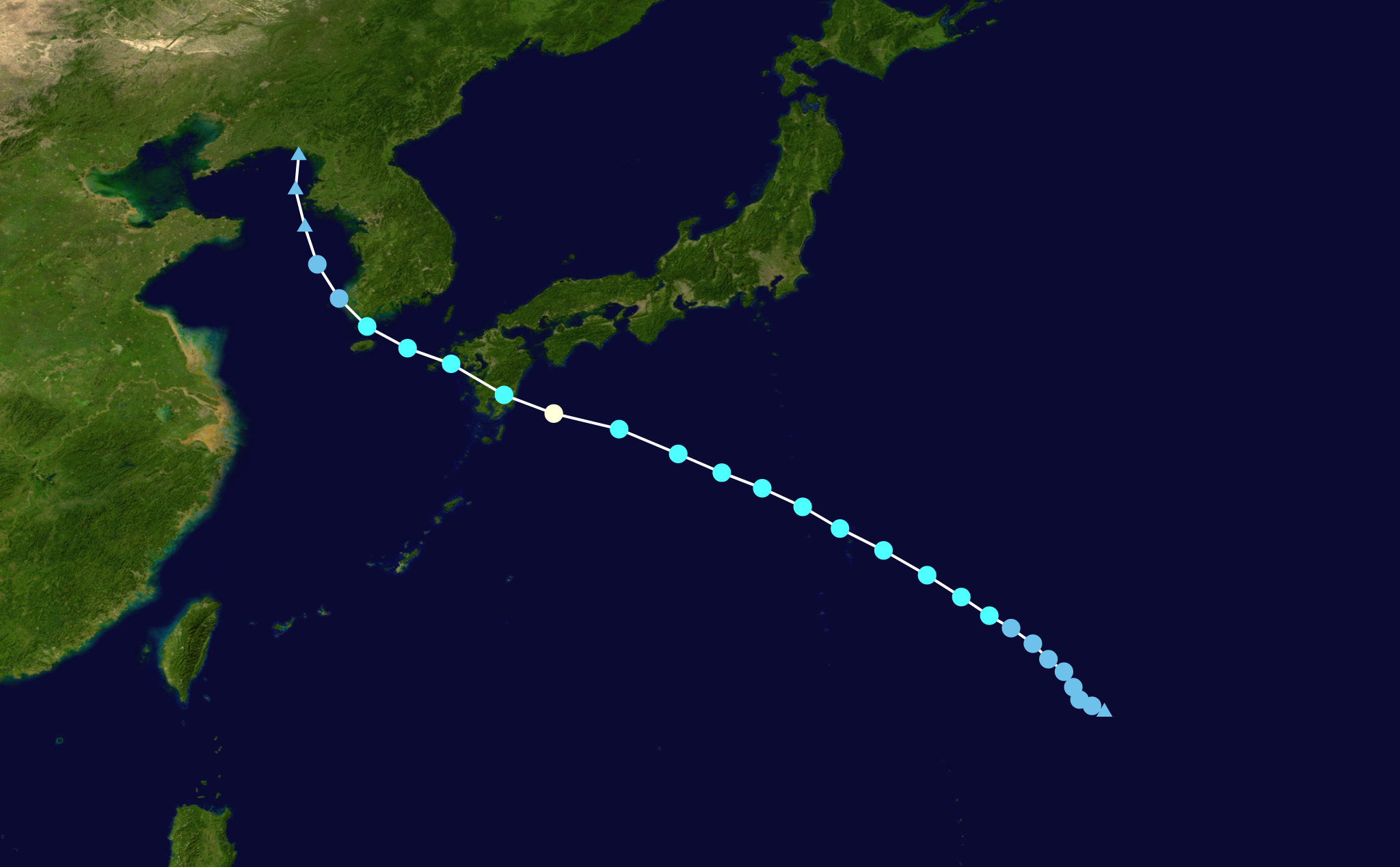
- Duration: July 26 – August 1
- Peak intensity: 95 km/h (60 mph) (10-min); 975 hPa (mbar)

An area of convection active for the previous 48 hours led to the formation of a low level circulation near 23°N 151°E early on July 27. Gradual intensification ensued, and the system developed into a tropical depression that evening, a tropical storm on July 28, and a typhoon by July 31 as it moved west-northwest. The cyclone struck southern Kyūshū, in Japan, early on July 31 which weakened the cyclone. The tropical storm then moved into the East China Sea which continuing to spin down. Upper-level wind shear took its toll, leading to its weakening into a tropical depression and its ultimate dissipation in the Yellow Sea along the west coast of Korea. Economic losses totaled to ¥12 billion (US$54.4 million).

=== Tropical Storm 11W ===
- Tropical storm (JMA)
- Tropical depression (SSHWS)
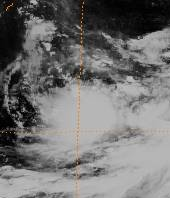
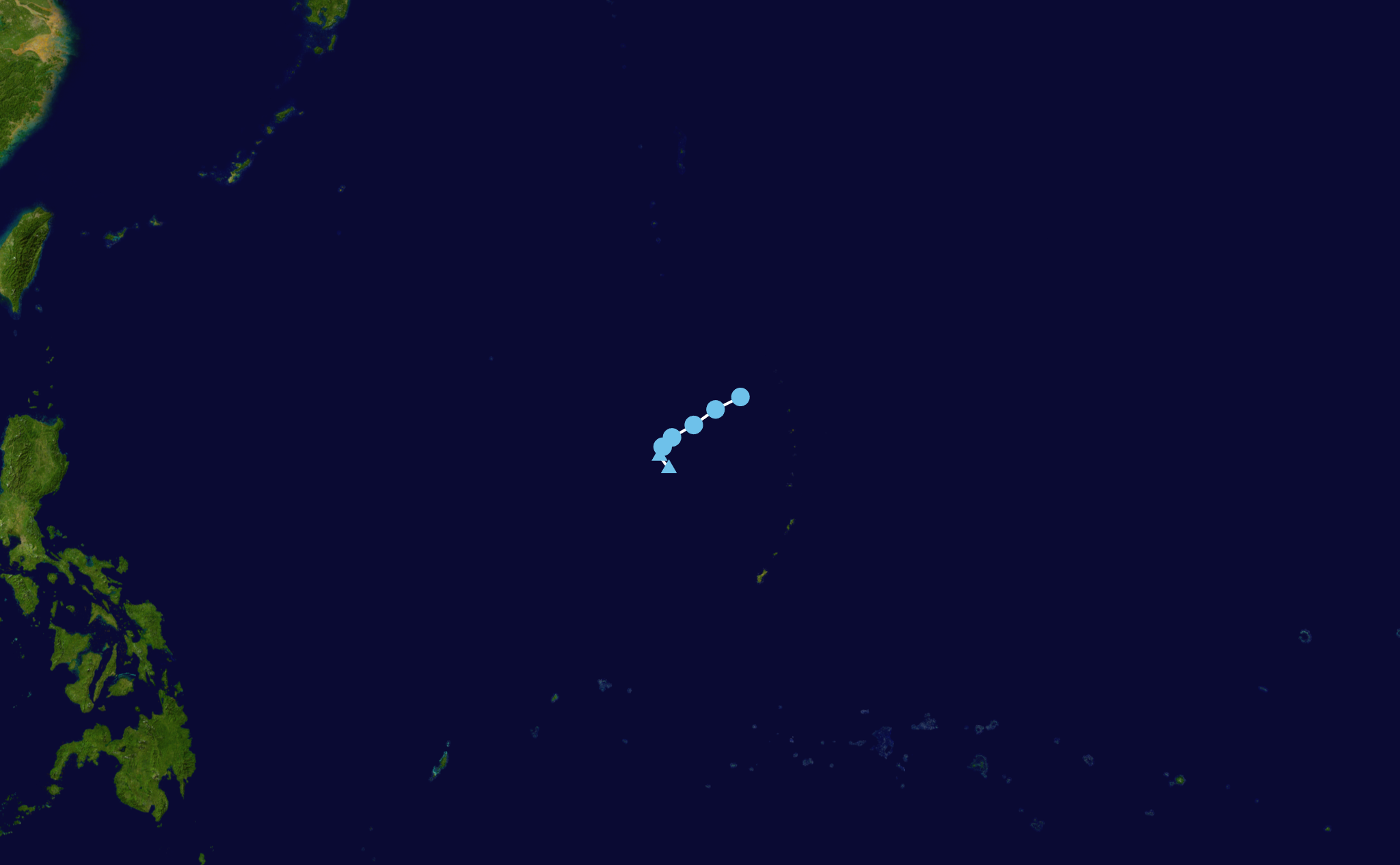
- Duration: July 31 – August 2
- Peak intensity: 75 km/h (45 mph) (10-min); 988 hPa (mbar)

Both Tropical Storm 11W and Tropical Storm Phyllis were associated with the same synoptic scale feature, similar to Maury and Nina. On July 30 the monsoon trough extended from the Northern Marianas islands southeast toward Palau. Two circulations were at opposite ends of the trough. Tropical Storm 11W formed north of Guam late on July 31. Moving northeast, the tropical depression experienced vertical wind shear as the upper anticyclone fostering development accelerated faster than the tropical depression. This led to dissipation by late morning on August 2.

=== Severe Tropical Storm Phyllis ===
- Severe tropical storm (JMA)
- Tropical storm (SSHWS)
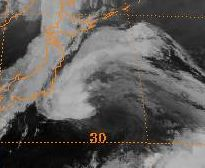
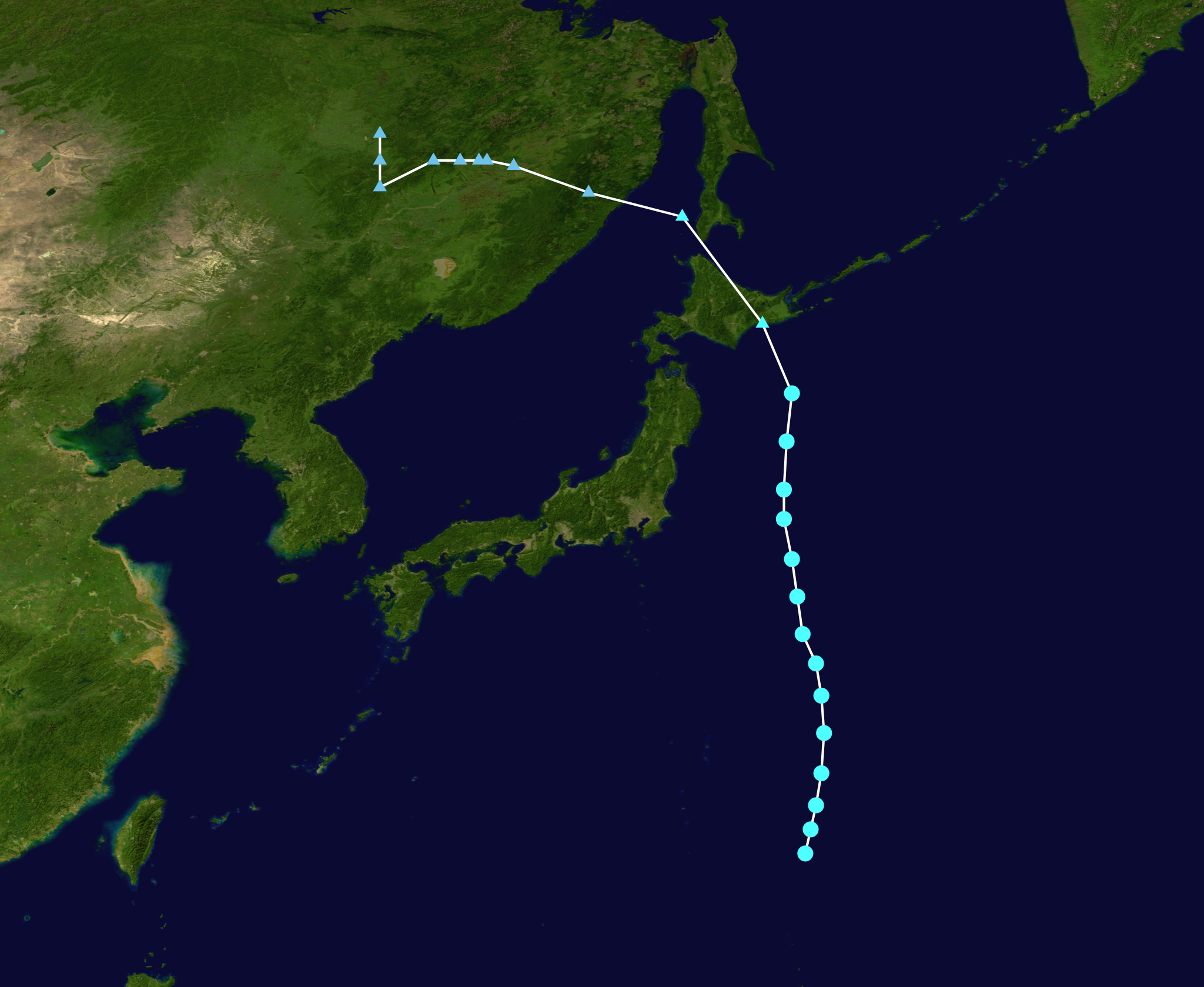
- Duration: August 2 – August 5
- Peak intensity: 100 km/h (65 mph) (10-min); 975 hPa (mbar)

A second circulation along the monsoon trough which spawned Tropical Storm 11W was noted north of Palau. By late on August 3 it had developed into Tropical Storm Phyllis. Tracking northward at 11 knots (20 km/h), the cyclone intensified slowly due to westerly vertical wind shear. Increased vertical wind shear from the southeast and cooler sea surface temperatures led to the decline of Phyllis late on August 4, and it dissipated as a tropical cyclone early on August 5. Its remains tracked northeast, merging with an extratropical cyclone offshore Japan. Eleven perished during Phyllis, with 22,500 people being left homeless across Japan.

=== Tropical Storm Roy (Miling) ===
- Tropical storm (JMA)
- Tropical storm (SSHWS)
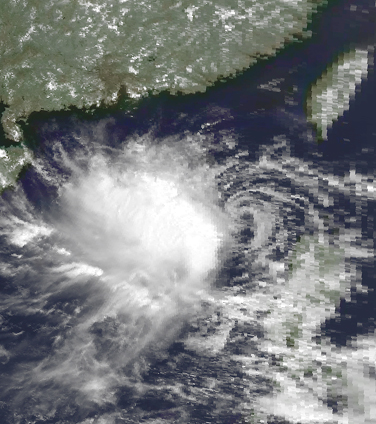
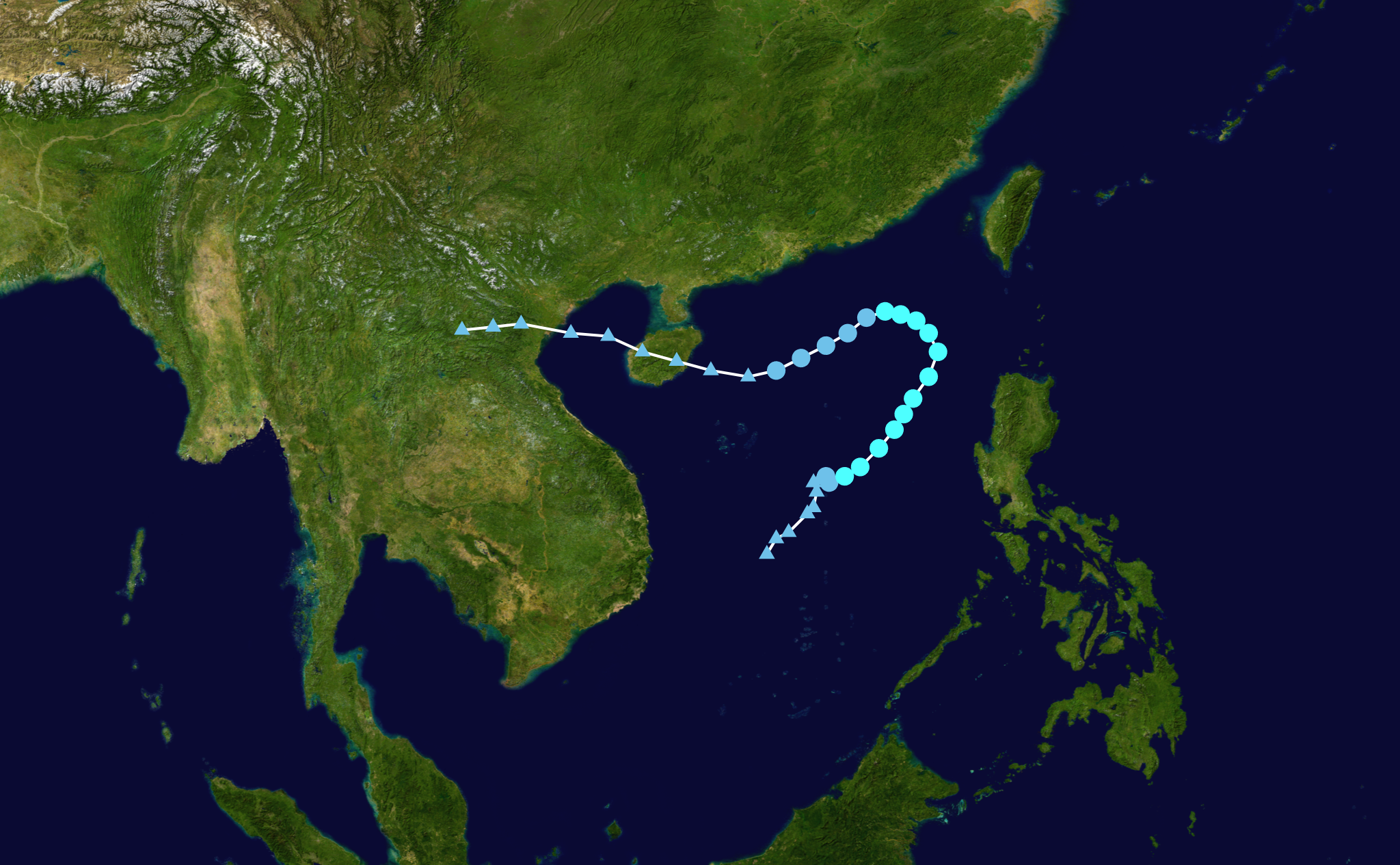
- Duration: August 2 – August 11
- Peak intensity: 85 km/h (50 mph) (10-min); 985 hPa (mbar)

The initial disturbance formed east of Vietnam during the first few days of August. By August 2, a low level circulation was present. Moving slowly to the north, the low-pressure area developed central convection. By late on August 4, the disturbance strengthened into a tropical depression before reaching tropical storm strength on August 5. Easterly shear began soon afterwards, and Roy's circulation center became exposed well to the east of the main convection. This caused its subsequent weakening and dissipation before reaching Hainan Island. Winds gusted to 41 knots (76 km/h) on the northwest side of Hong Kong's airport.

=== Severe Tropical Storm Susan ===
- Severe tropical storm (JMA)
- Tropical storm (SSHWS)
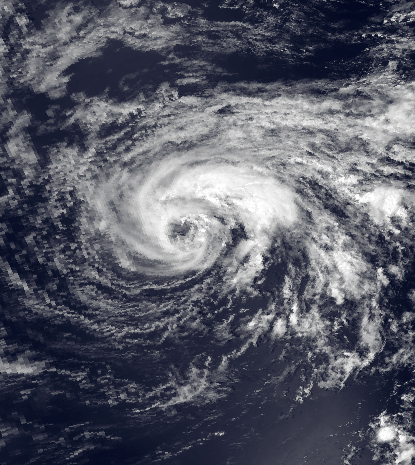
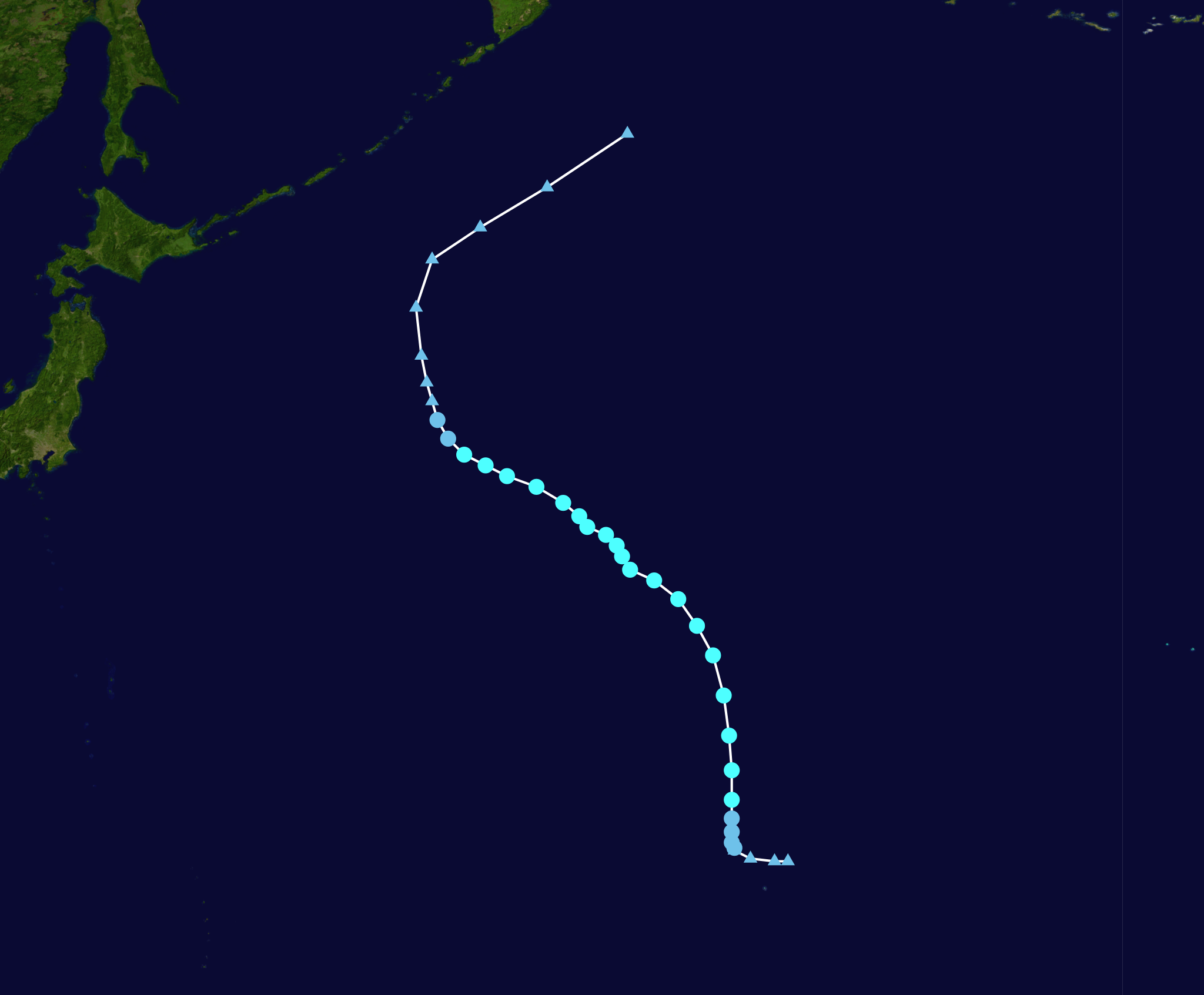
- Duration: August 6 – August 14
- Peak intensity: 110 km/h (70 mph) (10-min); 980 hPa (mbar)

The monsoon trough became well-established along 20 degrees north latitude. To the east of Phyllis, part of the monsoon trough shifted east towards Wake Island while the western portion moved north with Phyllis. Early on August 7, a tropical disturbance was noted about 110 kilometres (68 mi) north of Wake Island. During this time, Wake experienced gale-force winds and heavy rainfall. The low level center became exposed for a time, though gales continued. By late on August 8, convection at the edge of the surface low strengthened as the vertical wind shear weakened. At this point, the gale center was deemed to be a tropical cyclone, and was named Susan. The storm tracked north until reaching 30 degrees north latitude, before turning northwest towards a weak cold front. Early on August 11, Susan entrained cooler and drier air from behind the frontal zone which led to a significant reduction in thunderstorm activity. A warm core ridge building to its northeast forced the storm on a more west-northwest course, and as a second cold front approached, Susan recurved into the boundary, becoming an extratropical cyclone during the late morning of August 13.

=== Typhoon Thad (Openg) ===
- Typhoon (JMA)
- Category 2 typhoon (SSHWS)
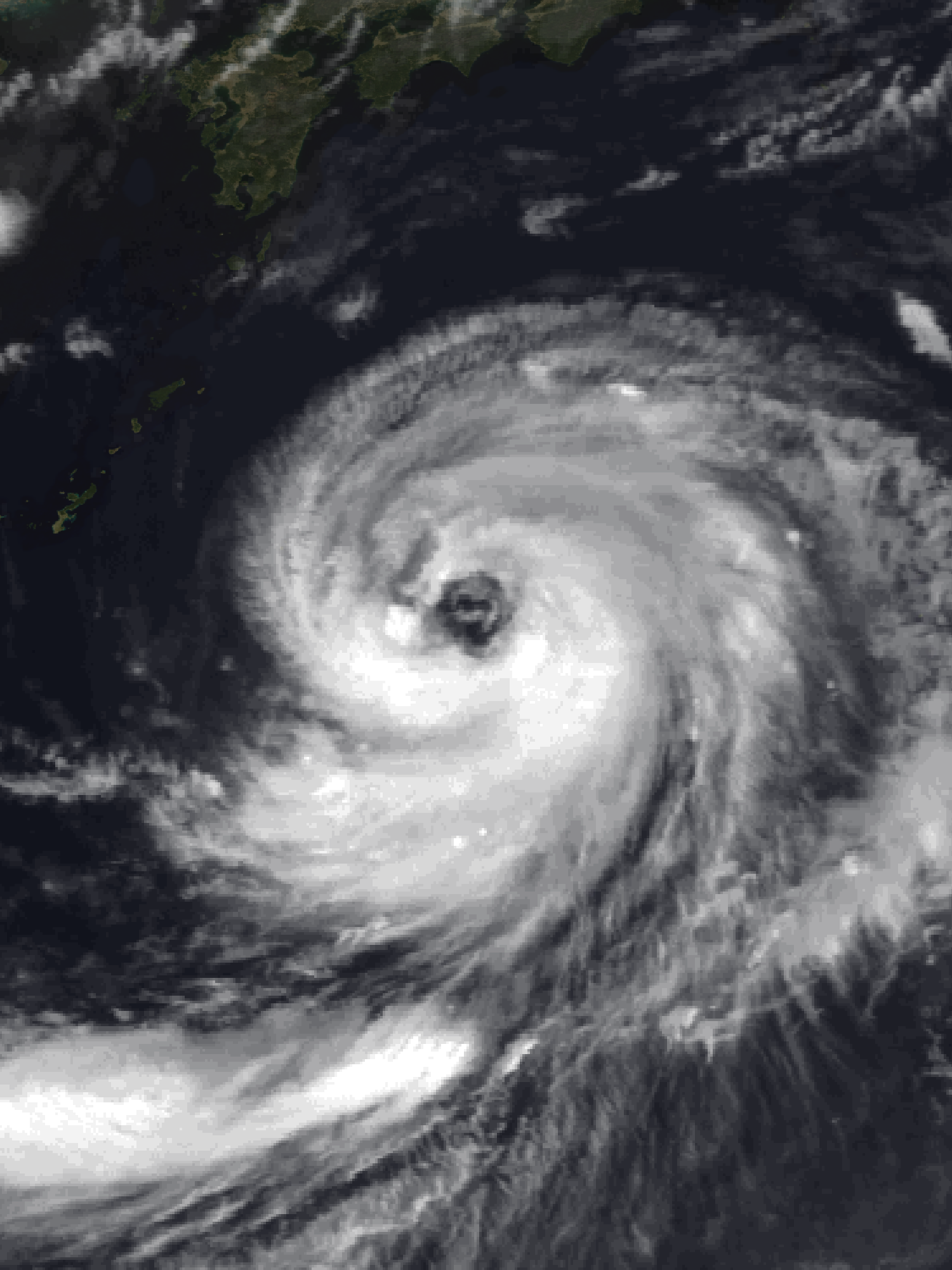
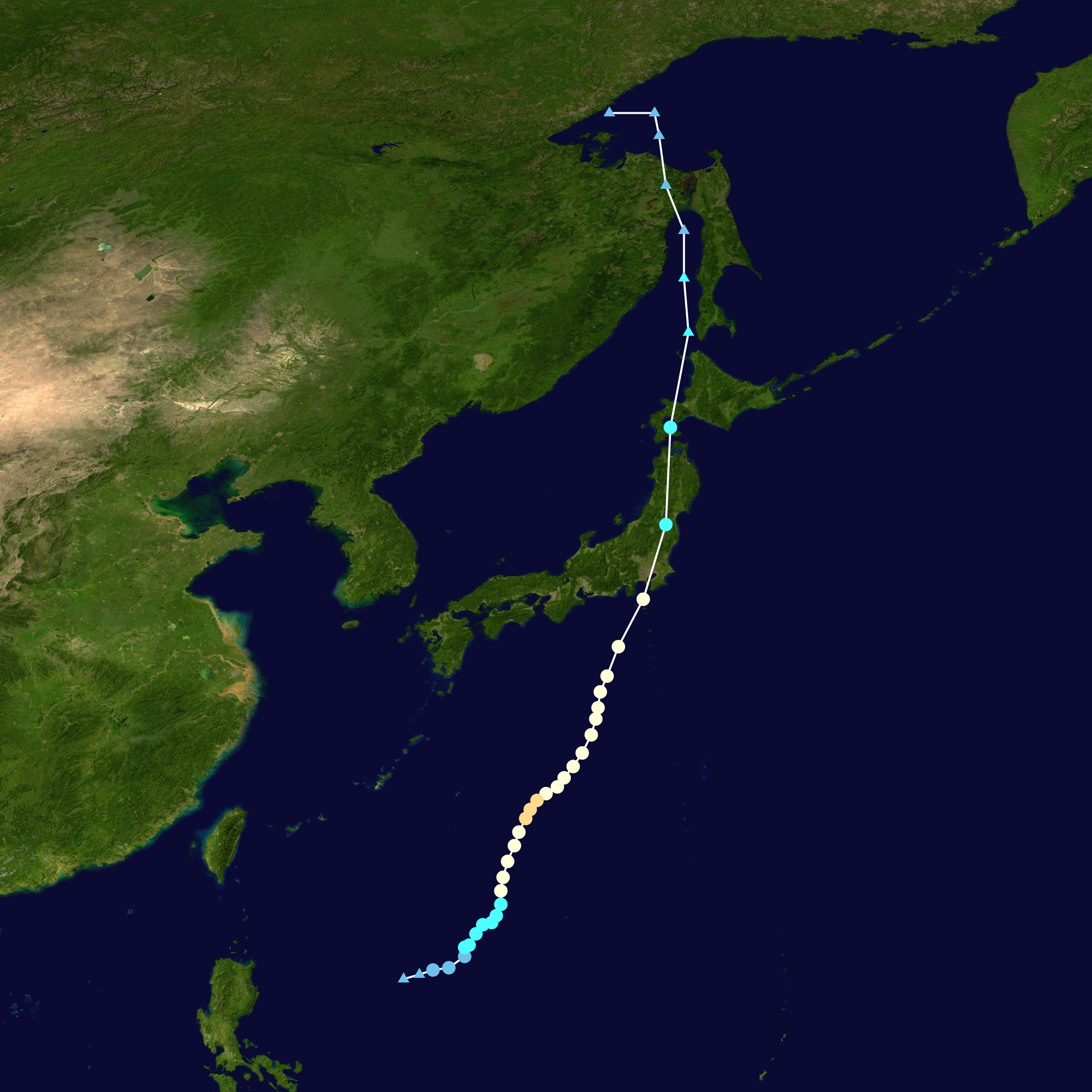
- Duration: August 15 – August 23
- Peak intensity: 130 km/h (80 mph) (10-min); 955 hPa (mbar)

An active monsoon trough spawned three tropical cyclones within 48 hours beginning on August 16. Thad was the first of the trio, initially noted on August 10 near 18°N 130°E. On August 15, limited outflow was witnessed over its low level circulation. The system developed into a tropical depression late on August 16. Thad moved north and northeast, maturing into a typhoon by late morning on August 18. On August 22 Thad accelerated northward between a subtropical ridge to its east and a deepening shortwave to its west, striking eastern Japan with a forward motion near 45 knots (83 km/h). Thereafter, the cyclone rapidly transitioned into an extratropical cyclone by late on August 23. Twenty people died during Thad's passage of Japan.

=== Severe Tropical Storm Vanessa ===
- Severe tropical storm (JMA)
- Tropical storm (SSHWS)
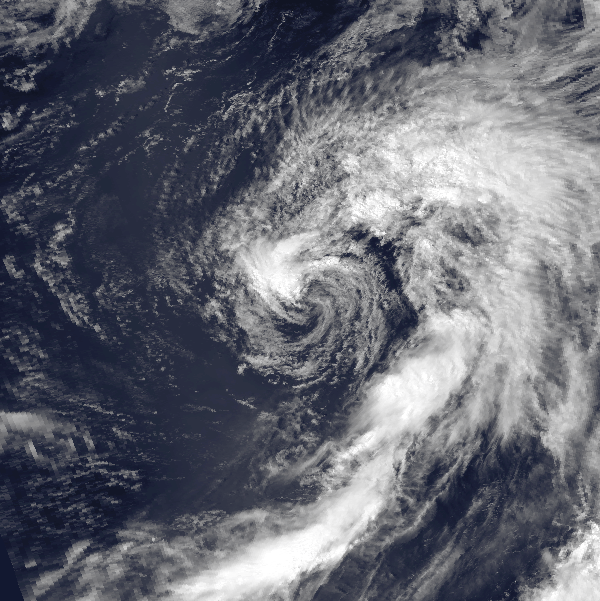
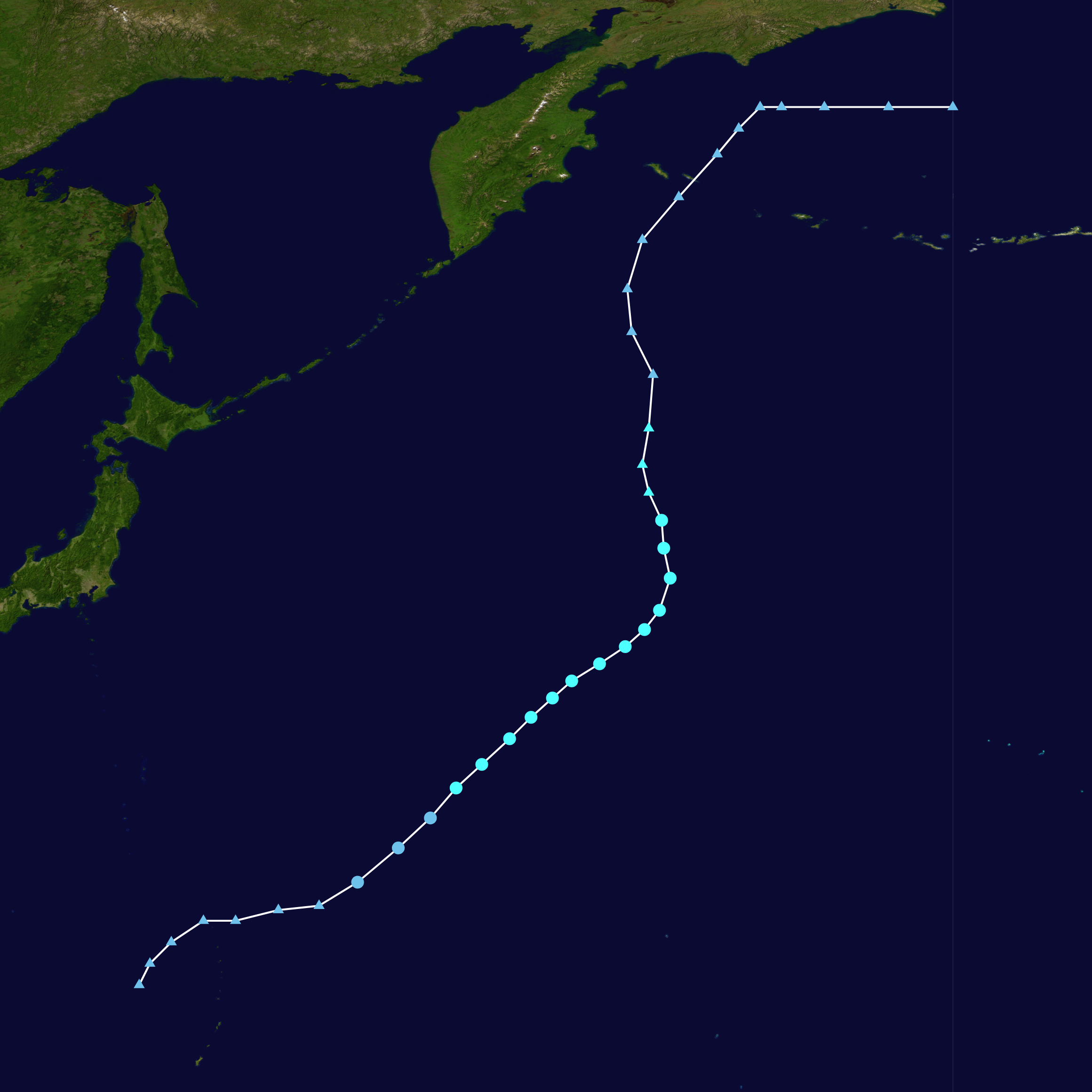
- Duration: August 16 – August 20
- Peak intensity: 95 km/h (60 mph) (10-min); 980 hPa (mbar)

This system developed about 110 kilometres (68 mi) south of Marcus Island near the merger of the monsoon trough and a sharp surface trough brought into the region by Susan. Thunderstorm activity increased in the area on August 12, the next system up the monsoon trough from Thad. Once Vanessa freed itself from nearby troughs of low pressure, it lost one of its primary outflow channels and its northeastward movement subsequently exposed the system to the main belt of the westerlies. Within two days of formation as a tropical cyclone, Vanessa was already devoid of convection and transitioning to an extratropical cyclone on the morning of August 19. The exposed surface circulation was tracked an additional couple days, merging with a mid-latitude system near 40°N 165°E on the morning of August 21.

=== Tropical Storm Warren ===
- Tropical storm (JMA)
- Tropical storm (SSHWS)
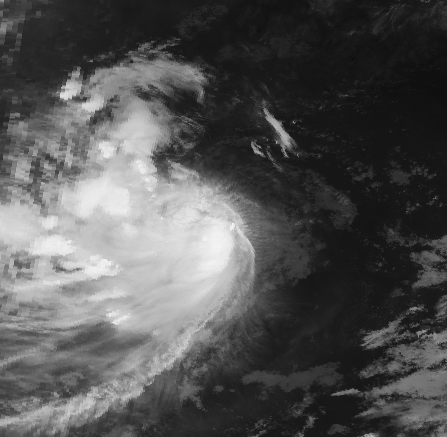
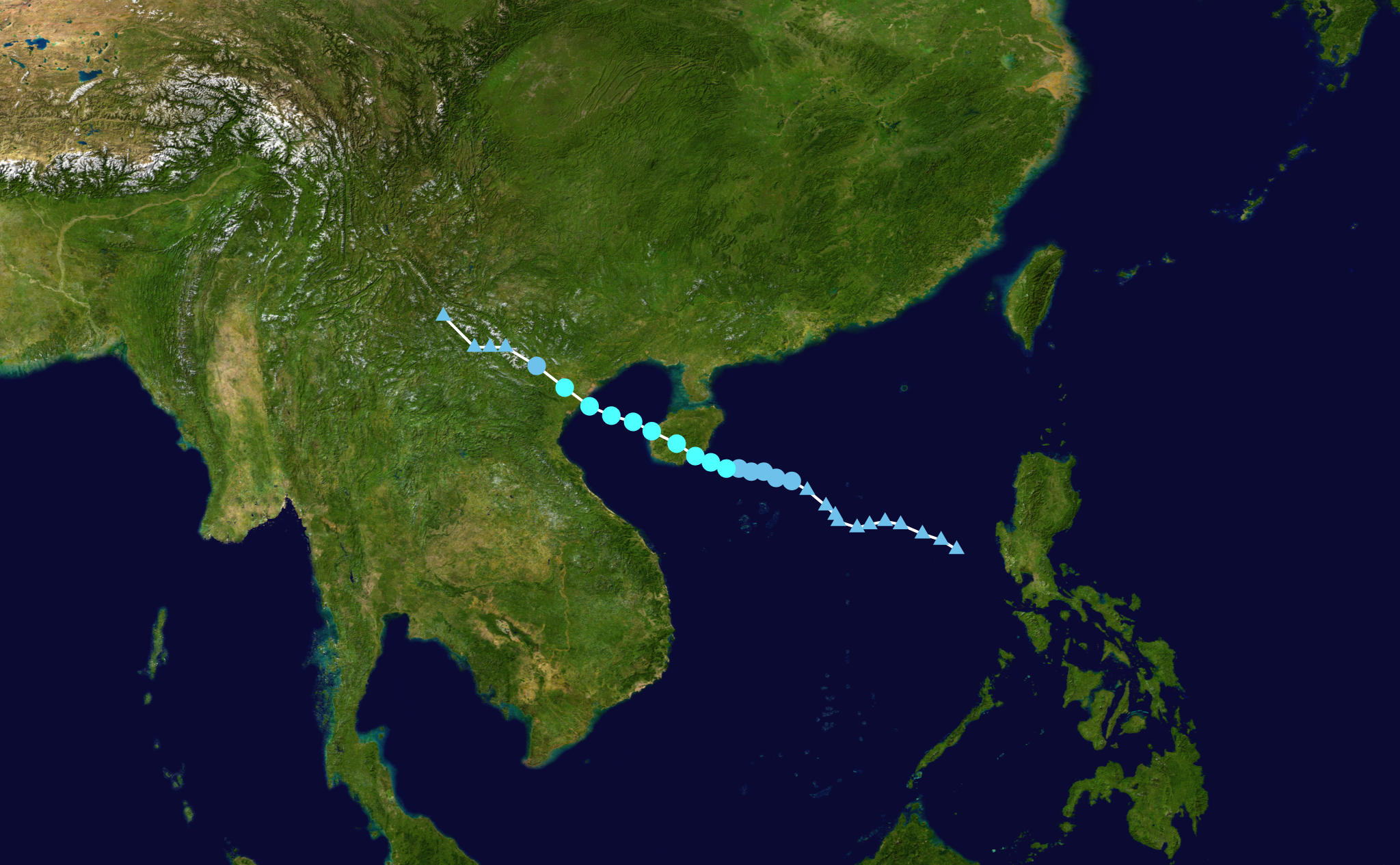
- Duration: August 16 – August 20
- Peak intensity: 65 km/h (40 mph) (10-min); 992 hPa (mbar)

The initial disturbance which led to Warren's formation formed within the monsoon trough on August 14. Strong northeasterly wind shear halted further development for the next few days. By August 17 the vertical wind shear relaxed, and thunderstorms increased south of the center. Moving slowly westward, the system became a tropical storm on the afternoon of August 18. Warren tracked over Hainan Island, and into the Gulf of Tonkin. Intensification renewed, but maximum sustained winds leveled off at 45 knots (83 km/h). The cyclone made its final landfall near Nam Định, Vietnam on August 20 and dissipated rapidly that evening.

=== Typhoon Agnes (Pining) ===
- Typhoon (JMA)
- Category 2 typhoon (SSHWS)
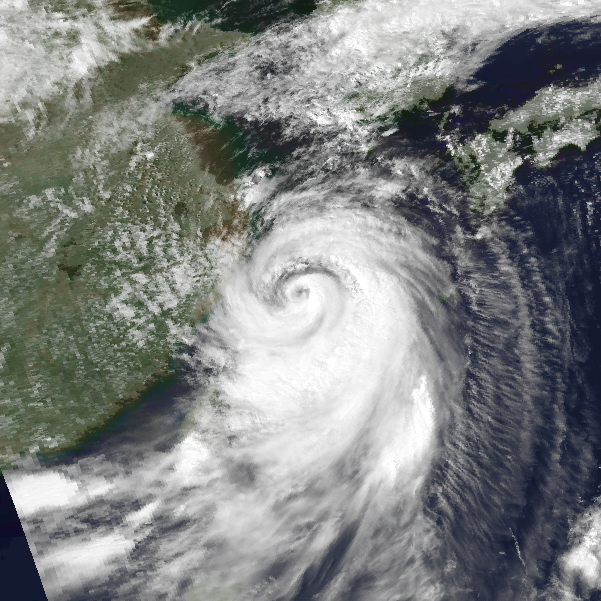
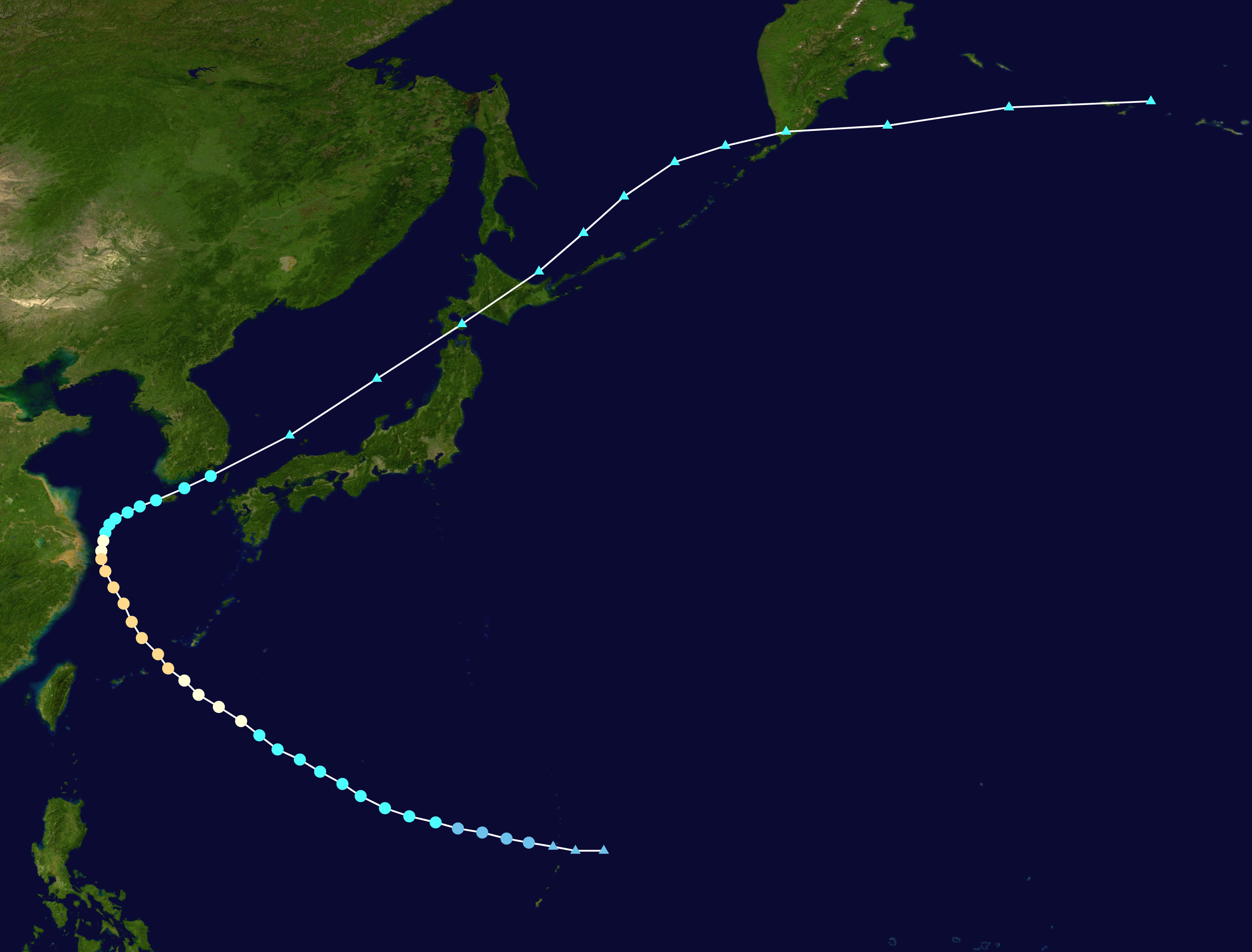
- Duration: August 25 – September 3
- Peak intensity: 150 km/h (90 mph) (10-min); 950 hPa (mbar)

On August 23, a well-defined Tropical Upper Tropospheric Trough moved westward from the International Date Line. On August 24, a surface cyclone developed in its vicinity near Wake Island. An extensive area of disorganized thunderstorm activity developed on its southwest side initially. As the convection moved westward, upper-level outflow improved northeast of Guam. A well-defined mid-level cyclone passed just north of the island on the morning of August 26. A low level center began to form as the area moved northwest of Guam. By the early morning of August 27, a tropical depression had formed about 600 kilometres (370 mi) west-northwest of Guam. Development continued, and the system became a tropical storm that evening. Moving west-northwestward, Agnes became a typhoon on the morning of August 29. The following day, the intensifying typhoon passed 165 kilometres (103 mi) southwest of Okinawa. Entering a region of hostile northerly vertical wind shear, Agnes began to weaken. Its central convection was almost completely gone by the morning of September 2. Agnes remained well south of Korea until September 3, when it unleashed a torrent of rainfall, the heaviest of the 20th century up to that time, when 711.2 millimetres (28.00 in) fell upon the peninsula. Agnes' remains passed through the Korea Strait into the Sea of Japan by September 4. A total of 139 lives were taken by Agnes.

=== Typhoon Bill ===
- Typhoon (JMA)
- Category 2 typhoon (SSHWS)
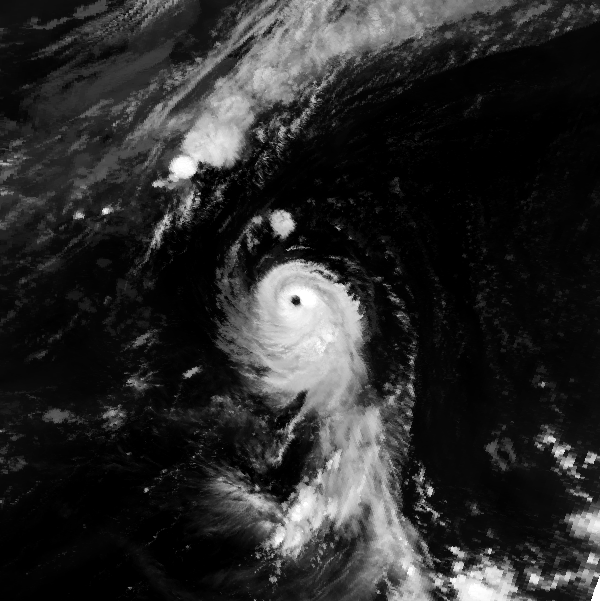
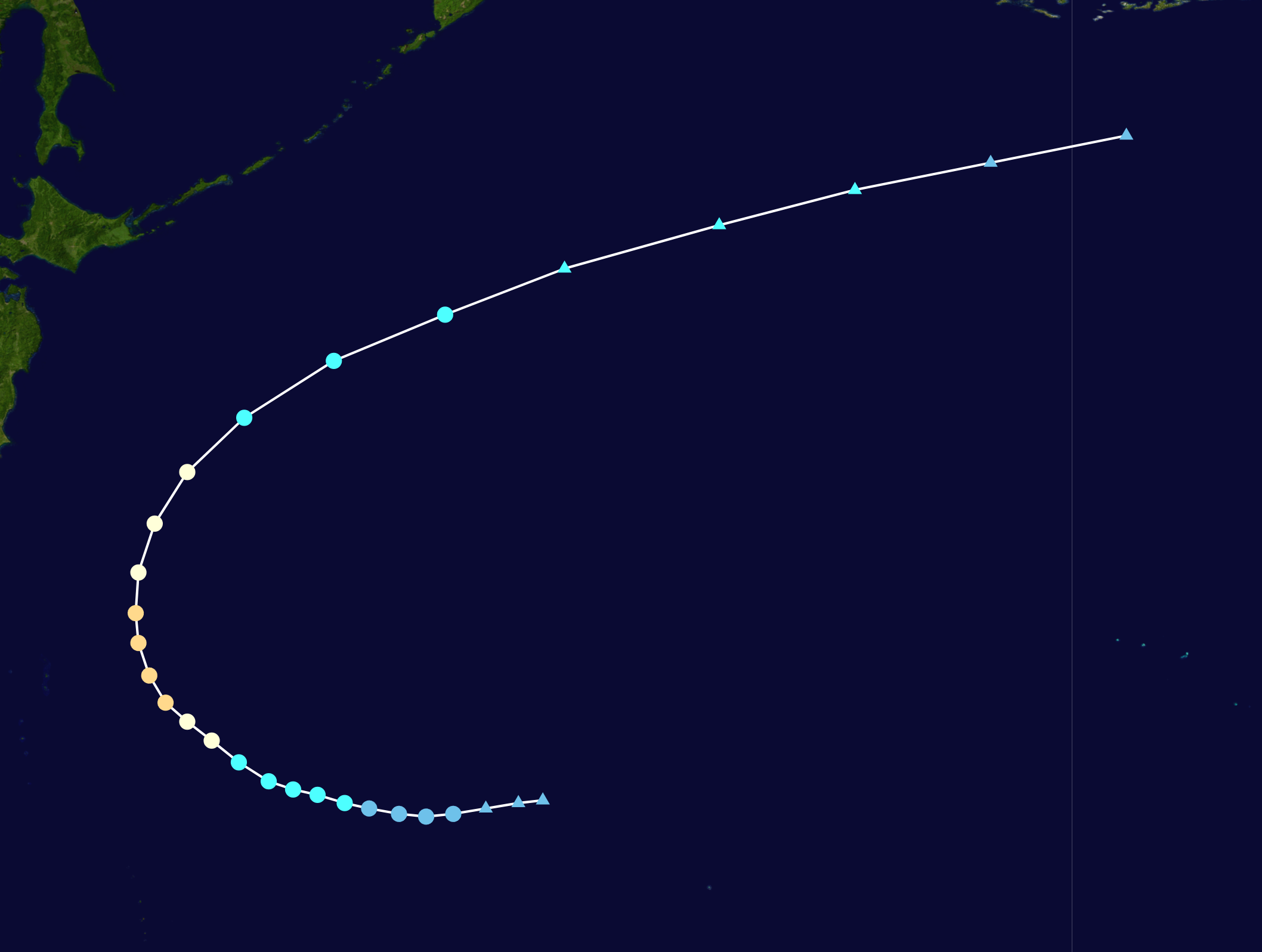
- Duration: September 1 – September 7
- Peak intensity: 140 km/h (85 mph) (10-min); 960 hPa (mbar)

The initial disturbance formed about 550 kilometres (340 mi) east-southeast of Marcus Island on September 1. A compact system, with an area of central convection 280 kilometres (170 mi) wide, Bill rapidly spun up into a tropical storm on September 3, and typhoon on September 4. Its central pressure was quite high for winds of that intensity due to the pressure gradient between the cyclone and the subtropical ridge to its northeast. The typhoon followed a classic parabolic track around the periphery of the subtropical ridge east of Japan, weakening back into a tropical storm on September 7. Rapid extratropical transition occurred as Bill interacted with the main belt of the Westerlies, and by midnight, Bill became an extratropical cyclone.

=== Typhoon Clara (Rubing) ===
- Very strong typhoon (JMA)
- Category 4 typhoon (SSHWS)
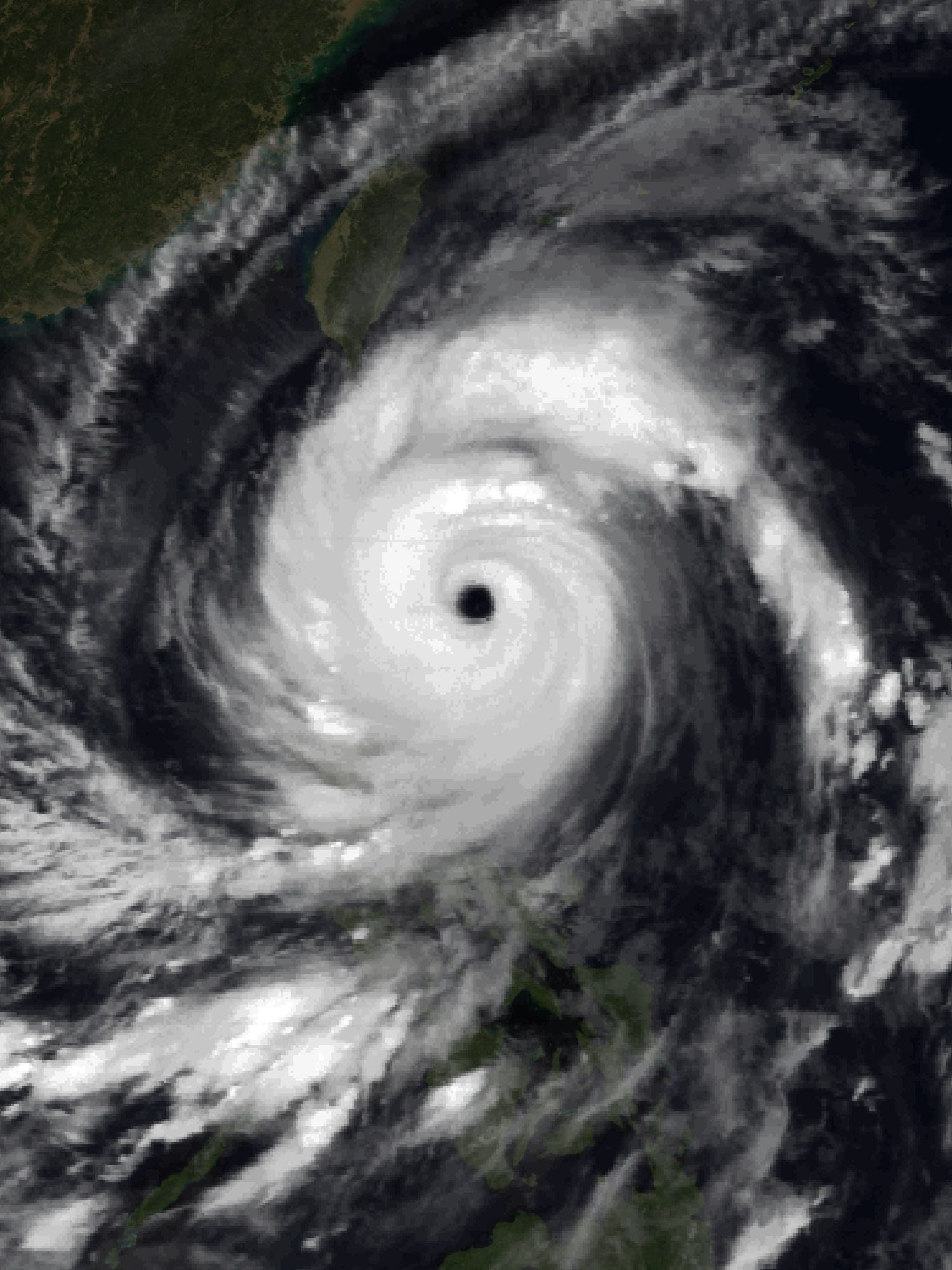
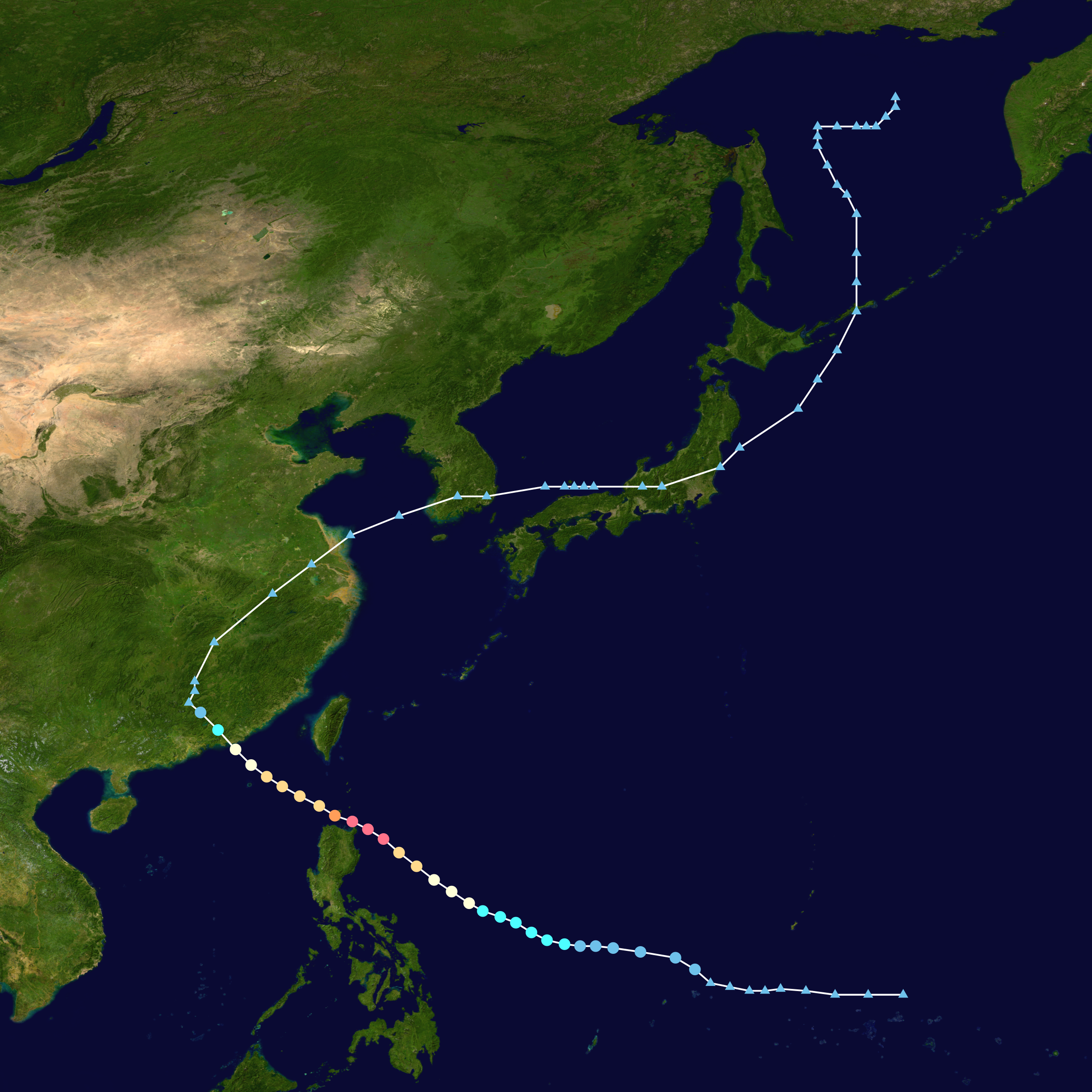
- Duration: September 13 – September 23
- Peak intensity: 185 km/h (115 mph) (10-min); 925 hPa (mbar)

The monsoon trough spawned a tropical depression on September 13 well east of the Philippines. The depression moved to the west-northwest, strengthening into a tropical storm on September 16 and a typhoon on September 18. Clara rapidly intensified to peak winds of 120 knots (220 km/h) on September 19 before hitting the northern tip of Luzon. Its circulation disrupted, Clara steadily weakened as it continued to the northwest, hitting southeast China on the 21st as a typhoon with winds of 70 knots (130 km/h). In Hong Kong, winds gusted to 51 knots (94 km/h) at Cheung Chau. Clara caused extensive damage and 141 deaths, leaving thousands homeless from the heavy rains.

=== Typhoon Doyle ===
- Typhoon (JMA)
- Category 1 typhoon (SSHWS)
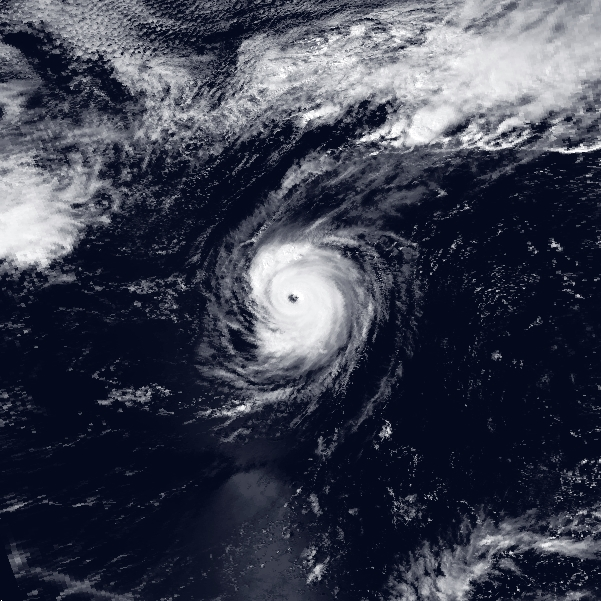
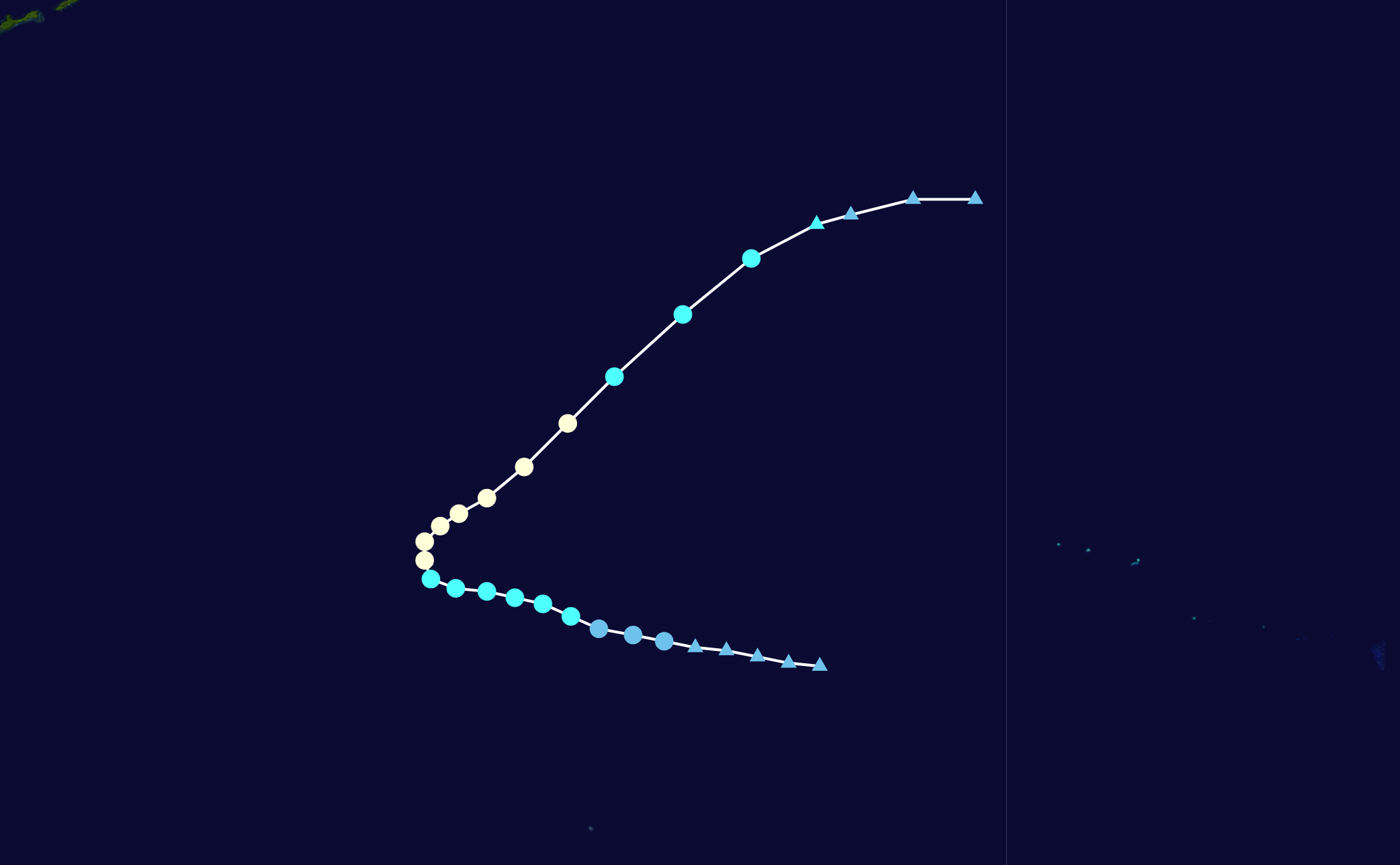
- Duration: September 19 – September 23
- Peak intensity: 130 km/h (80 mph) (10-min); 965 hPa (mbar)

Like Bill, Doyle was a small typhoon that spent its life out over the open Pacific Ocean. Its initial disturbance was first detected near 25°N 178°E on September 18. The cyclone built down to the surface while moving westward, and Doyle became a tropical storm on the afternoon of September 20 and a typhoon the following day. Recurving around the subtropical ridge, Doyle accelerated rapidly northeastward, weakening over cool waters as it was merging with a frontal zone and becoming an extratropical cyclone during the early morning of September 24 near 39°N 172°E.

=== Typhoon Elsie (Tasing) ===
- Violent typhoon (JMA)
- Category 5 super typhoon (SSHWS)
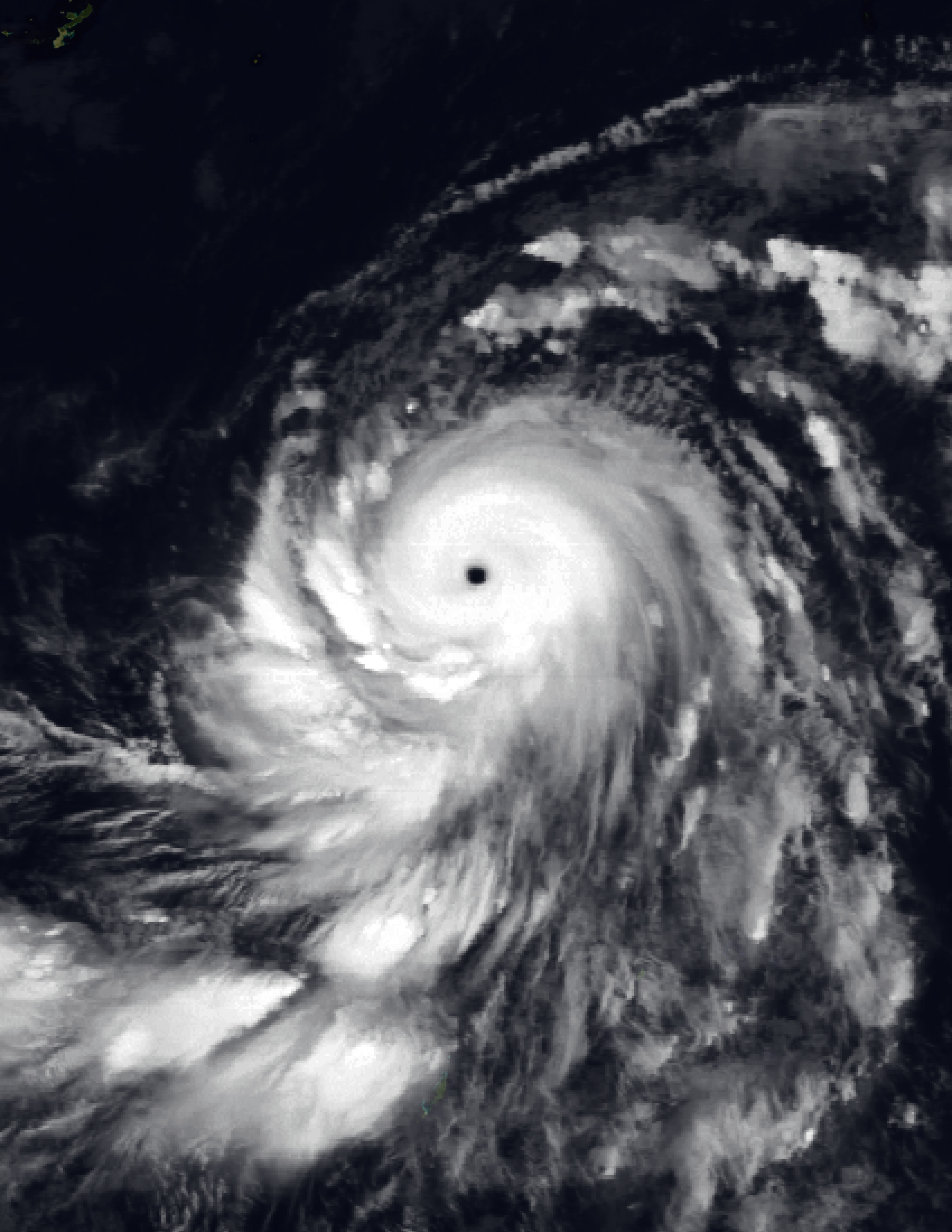
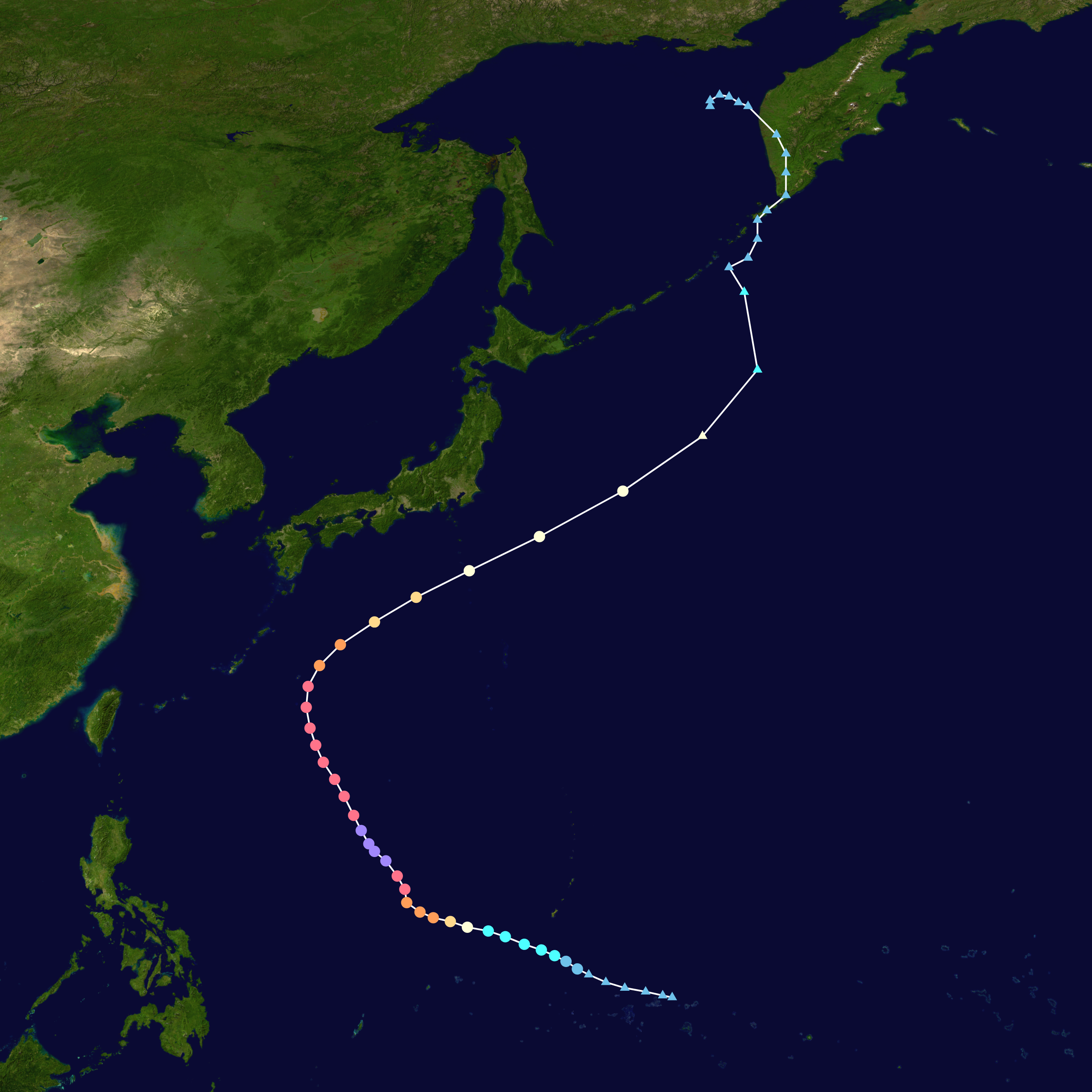
- Duration: September 23 – October 2
- Peak intensity: 220 km/h (140 mph) (10-min); 895 hPa (mbar)

The monsoon trough became diffuse on September 19 and September 20 in the wake of Typhoons Clara and Doyle. A small thunderstorm area formed near 8°N 150°E late on the morning of September 22, which slowly developed into a tropical depression early on September 25. Development was steady into a tropical storm later that day, a typhoon on the morning of September 26, and a super typhoon during the afternoon of September 27, maintaining that intensity into September 30. Elsie moved on a parabolic curve around the subtropical ridge to its northeast and east, moving offshore Japan as a typhoon on October 1 and October 2. By October 2, interaction with the upper trough which led to its recurvature also transitioned the typhoon into an extratropical cyclone. Typhoon Elsie’s maximum 1 minute sustained winds were 175 mph.

=== Tropical Storm Fabian (Unsing) ===
- Tropical storm (JMA)
- Tropical storm (SSHWS)
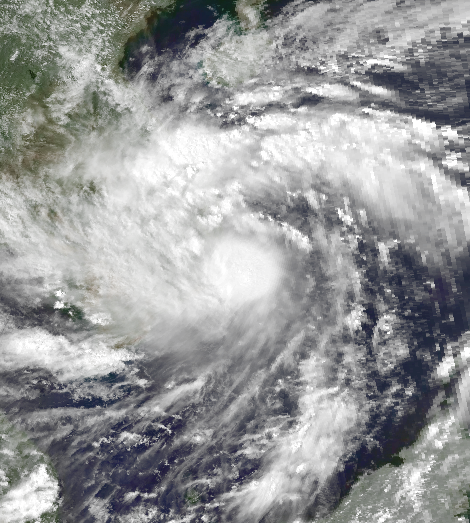
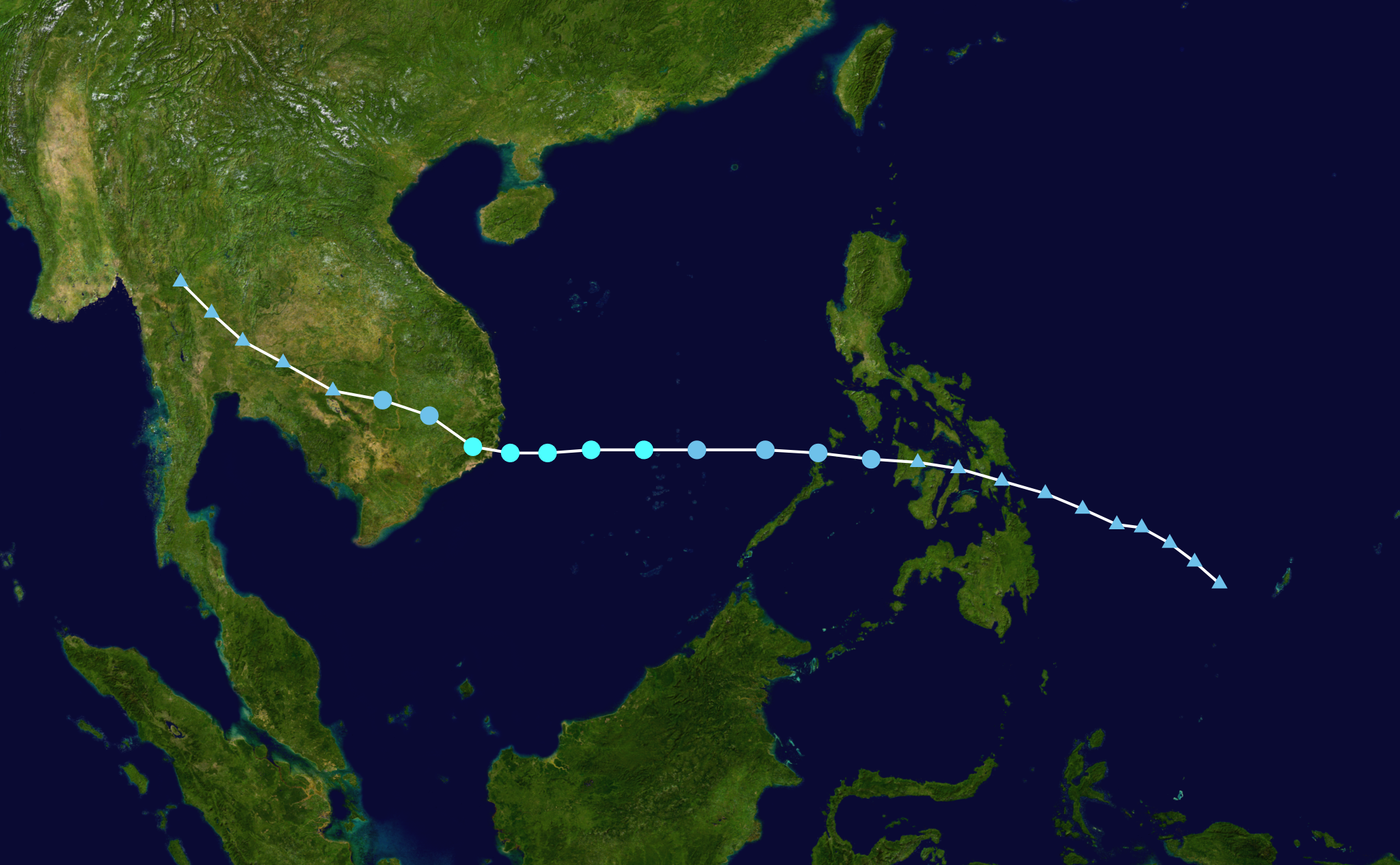
- Duration: October 10 – October 15
- Peak intensity: 85 km/h (50 mph) (10-min); 994 hPa (mbar)

An area of active yet disorganized thunderstorm activity was located northeast of Palau on October 6. Moving westward over the next several days, there was little change in organization until is approached Samar Island. Passing over the Philippines, it lost what convection it did have near the center, yet let to very heavy rainfall and flooding though a surface circulation was not apparent. Once the disturbance entered the South China Sea, it redeveloped and reached tropical depression strength on the afternoon of October 13. It crossed the sea and struck Cam Ranh Bay, Vietnam. By October 15, the cyclone had dissipated inland. The lowest air pressure value measured at a weather station in Nha Trang during the storm was 990.0 hPa (29.23 inHg).

=== Typhoon Gay (Walding) ===
- Very strong typhoon (JMA)
- Category 2 typhoon (SSHWS)
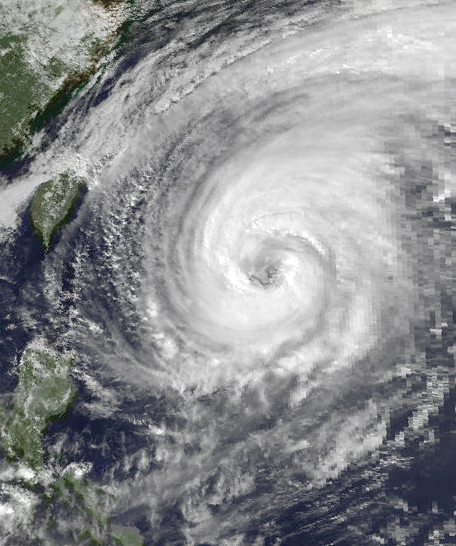
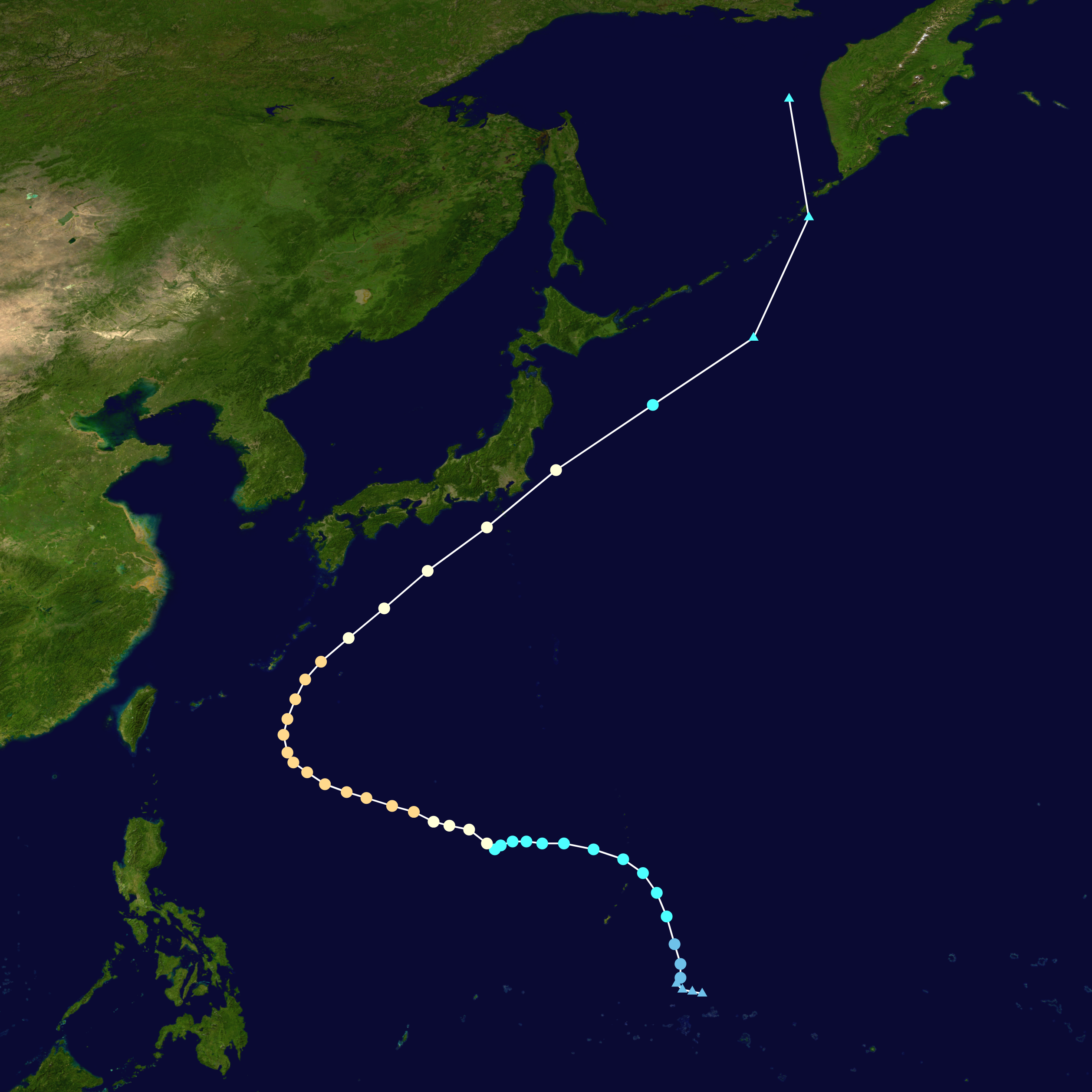
- Duration: October 14 – October 23
- Peak intensity: 155 km/h (100 mph) (10-min); 950 hPa (mbar)

The system formed within a very large area of thunderstorm activity. The system originally had a large circulation center, which led to problems in fixing its center via satellite imagery. The development of a large eye on October 20 finally led to the tracking of a more definitive, well-defined, circulation center. The typhoon brought relief to drought conditions in Okinawa, when 150 millimetres (5.9 in) of rainfall fell there are the circulation center of Gay moved by about 175 kilometres (109 mi) to their southeast. As it continued moving towards Japan, the center passed only 50 kilometres (31 mi) from Tokyo, bringing significant rainfall to central portions of the island archipelago. The typhoon ultimately merged with a second low pressure system moving eastward to the north of Japan.

=== Tropical Depression ===
- Tropical depression (CMA)
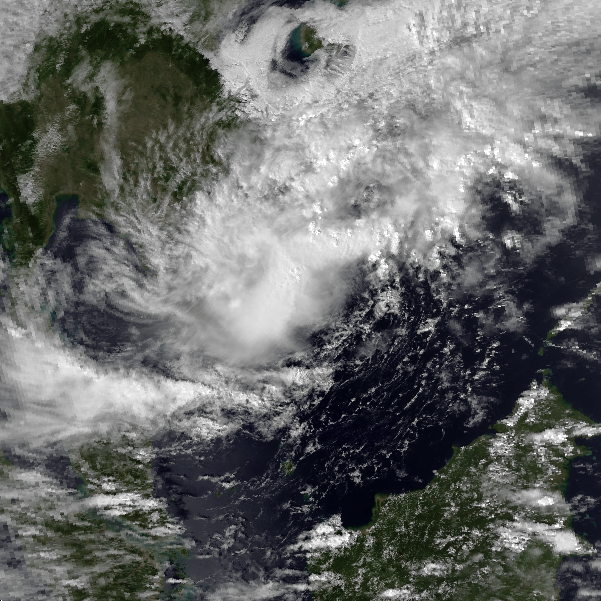
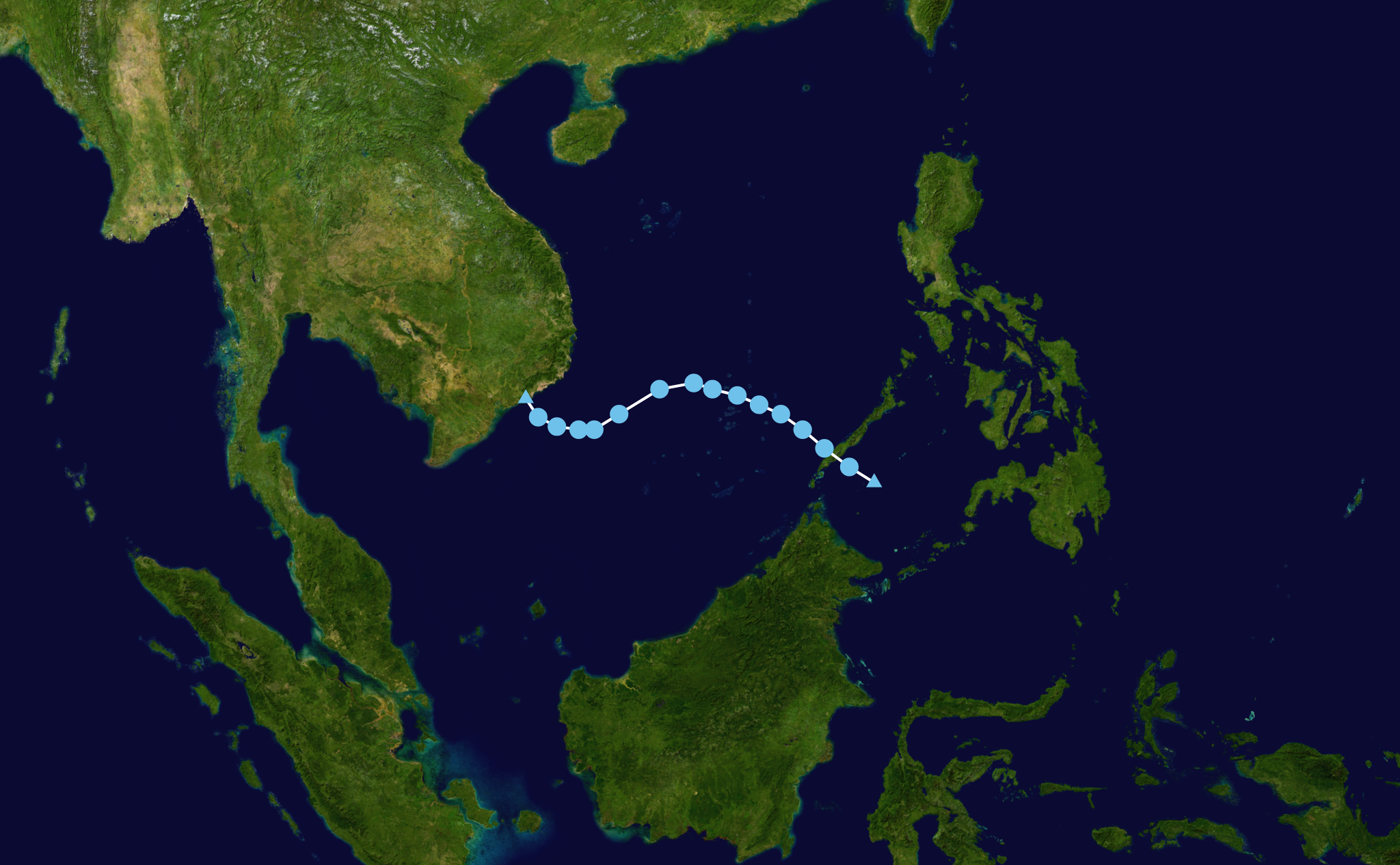
- Duration: November 7 – November 10
- Peak intensity: 55 km/h (35 mph) (10-min); 1002 hPa (mbar)

A tropical depression formed in the South China Sea on November 7, and moved inland into Vietnam on the 10th. This system was only recognized by the Hong Kong Royal Observatory and the China Meteorological Administration.

=== Typhoon Hazen (Yeyeng) ===
- Typhoon (JMA)
- Category 3 typhoon (SSHWS)
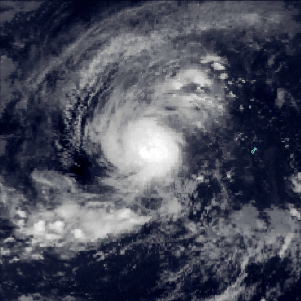
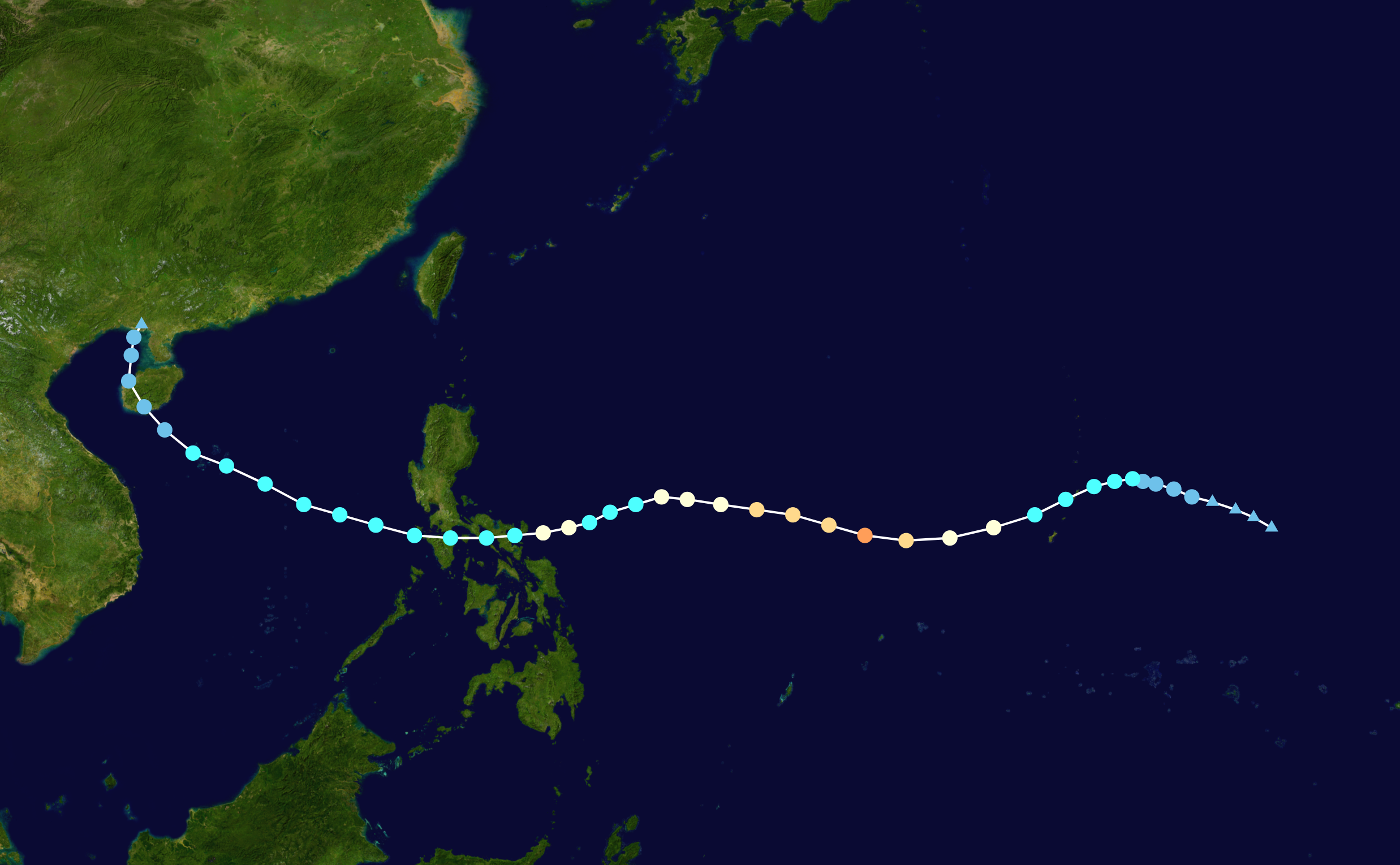
- Duration: November 13 – November 21
- Peak intensity: 130 km/h (80 mph) (10-min); 955 hPa (mbar)

A tropical disturbance developed along a trough east of Guam. Its circulation improved, and a low pressure center formed on November 13. It became a tropical depression by the morning of November 14, and a tropical storm that evening. Moving on a general westward track across the western Pacific, it moved over northern Saipan on the afternoon of November 15, bringing gusts approaching typhoon force. Hazen moved about 110 kilometres (68 mi) north of Guam before reaching typhoon strength on early on November 16. Its intensity fluctuated on November 17 and November 18 as Hazen interacted with a nearby frontal zone. Weakening as it neared the Philippines, Hazen moved just south of Catanduanes Island, entering the South China Sea. Never recovering from the mountainous archipelago, Hazen struck Vietnam about 280 kilometres (170 mi) east-northeast of Hanoi, and dissipated as it entered southeast China.

=== Typhoon Irma (Anding) ===
- Violent typhoon (JMA)
- Category 4 super typhoon (SSHWS)
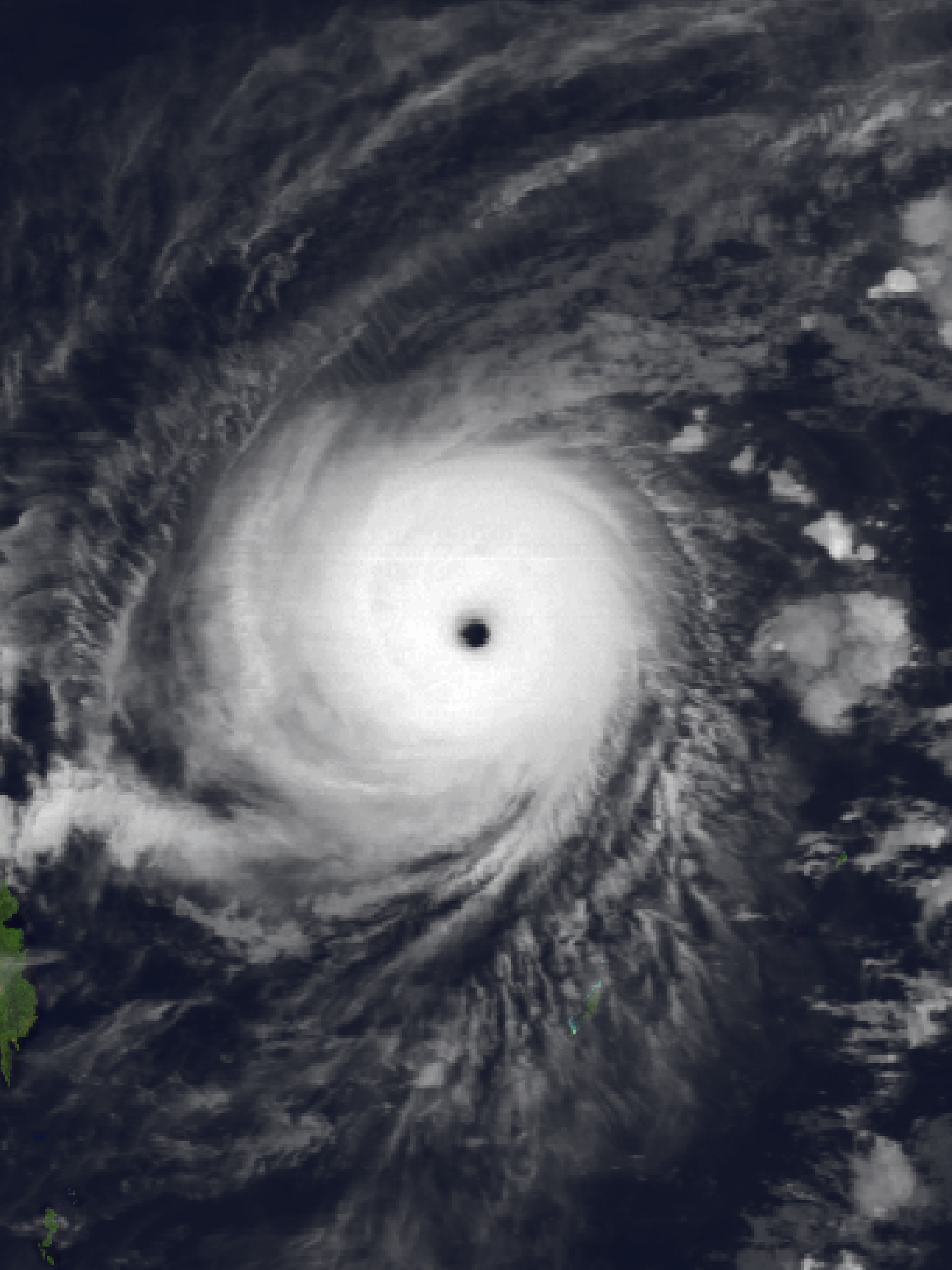
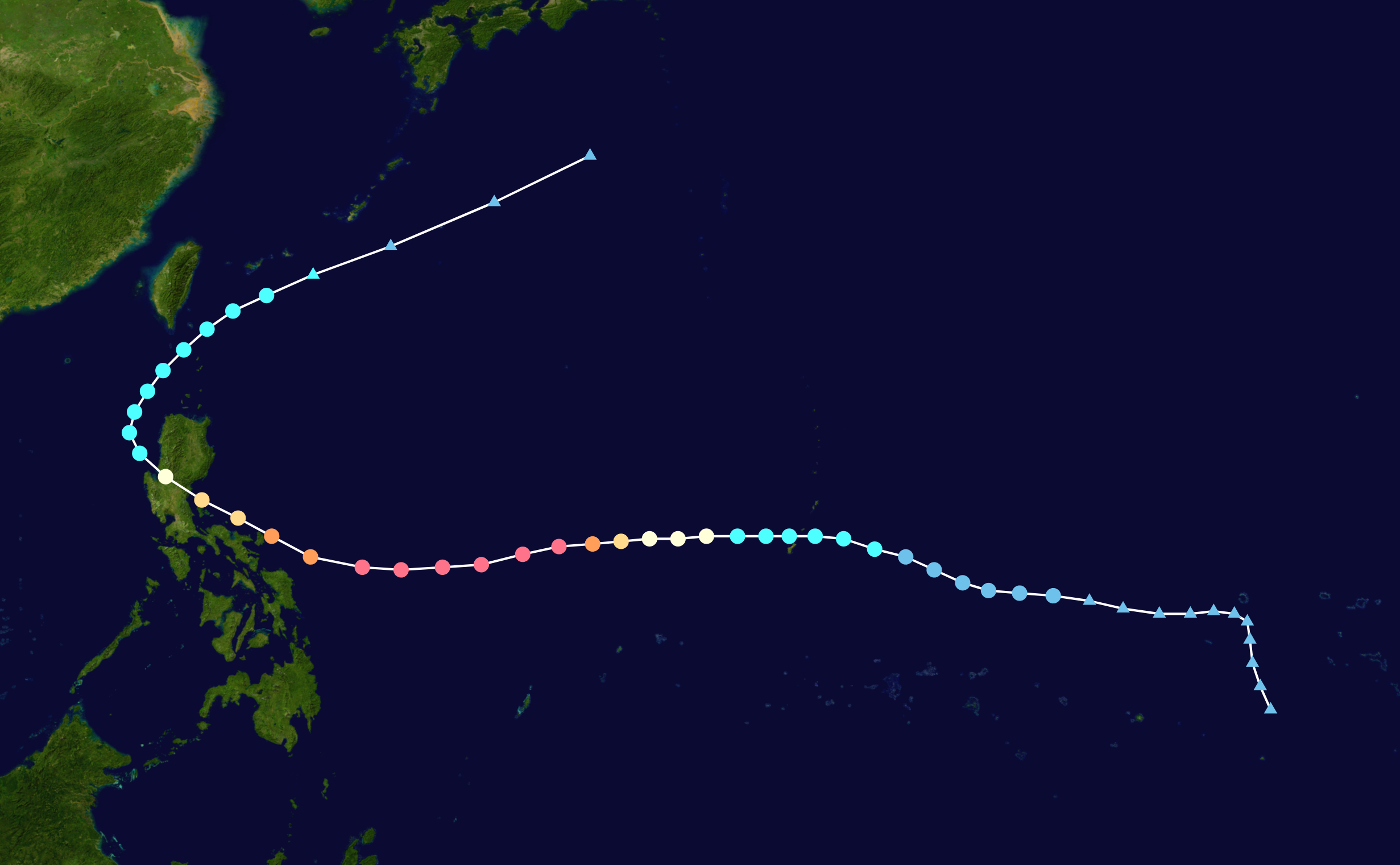
- Duration: November 18 – November 27
- Peak intensity: 205 km/h (125 mph) (10-min); 905 hPa (mbar)

Super Typhoon Irma developed from the near-equatorial trough on November 17. As a tropical depression, it headed westward, and steadily intensified, first to a tropical storm on November 19, later to a typhoon on November 20. Irma quickly strengthened on November 22 to a super typhoon with maximum winds of 135 knots (250 km/h), but its outflow was disrupted by the Philippines to the southwest. Irma hit the northern Philippines on November 24 with maximum sustained winds of 85 knots (157 km/h), and rapidly weakened over the country. As a weakened tropical storm, Irma turned northeastward, where it was absorbed by a cold front on November 27. A total of 409 fatalities see also the similar track of typhoon Irma in 1974.

=== Tropical Storm Jeff (Binang) ===
- Tropical storm (JMA)
- Tropical storm (SSHWS)
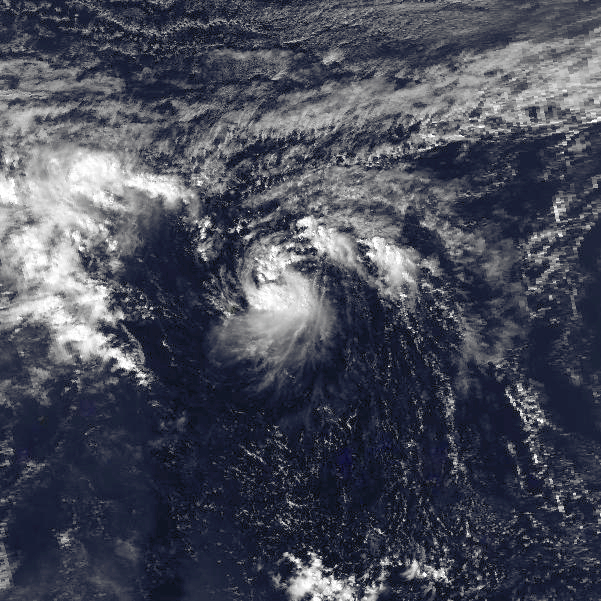
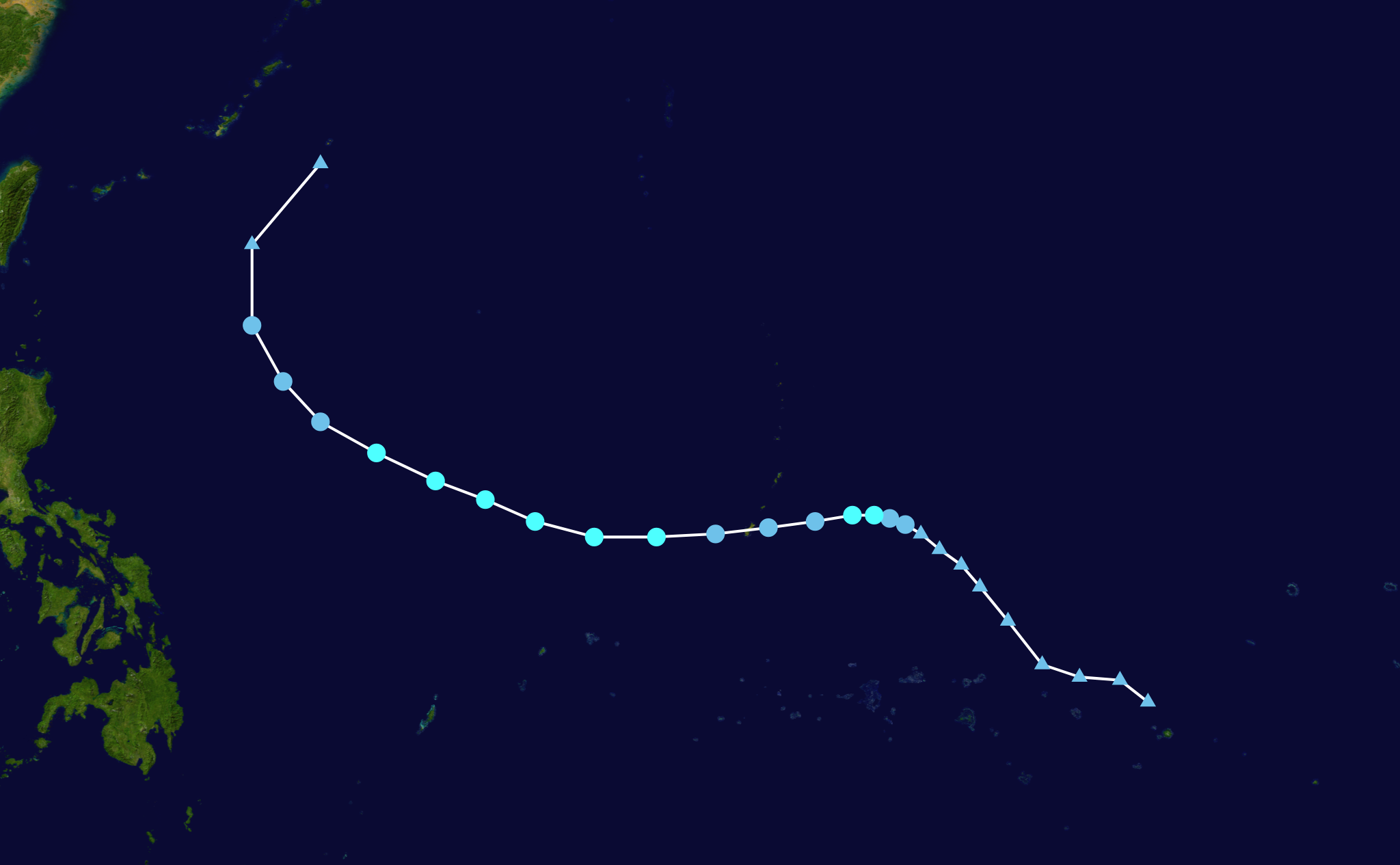
- Duration: November 20 – November 26
- Peak intensity: 75 km/h (45 mph) (10-min); 1000 hPa (mbar)

A distinct surface circulation formed by November 18. Jeff became a tropical storm on November 23 on the heels of Irma and approaching Guam. It navigated through a break in the subtropical ridge and dissipated over cooler waters on November 26 due to increasing vertical wind shear well to the south of Japan.

=== Typhoon Kit (Kadiang) ===
- Very strong typhoon (JMA)
- Category 4 typhoon (SSHWS)
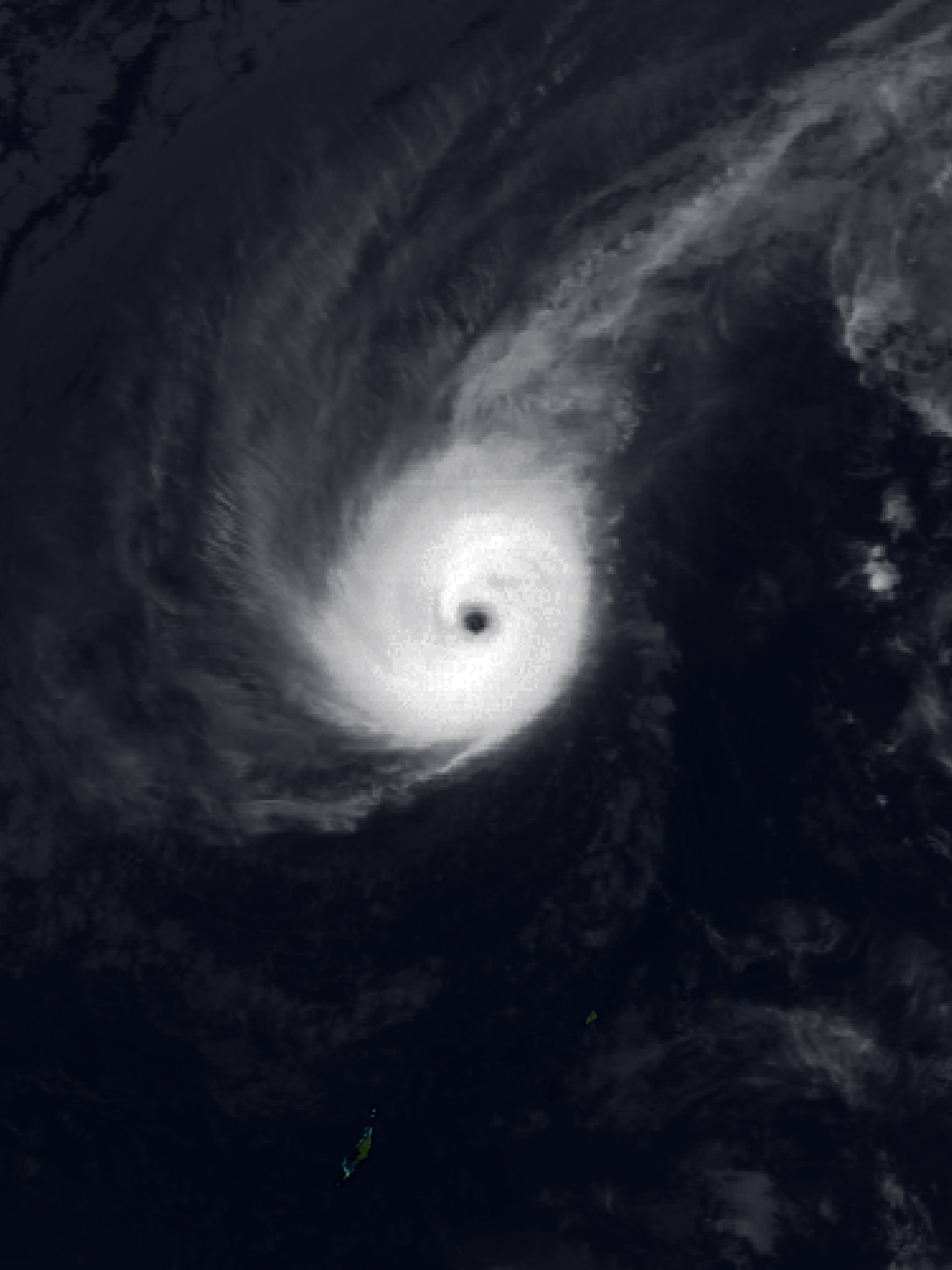
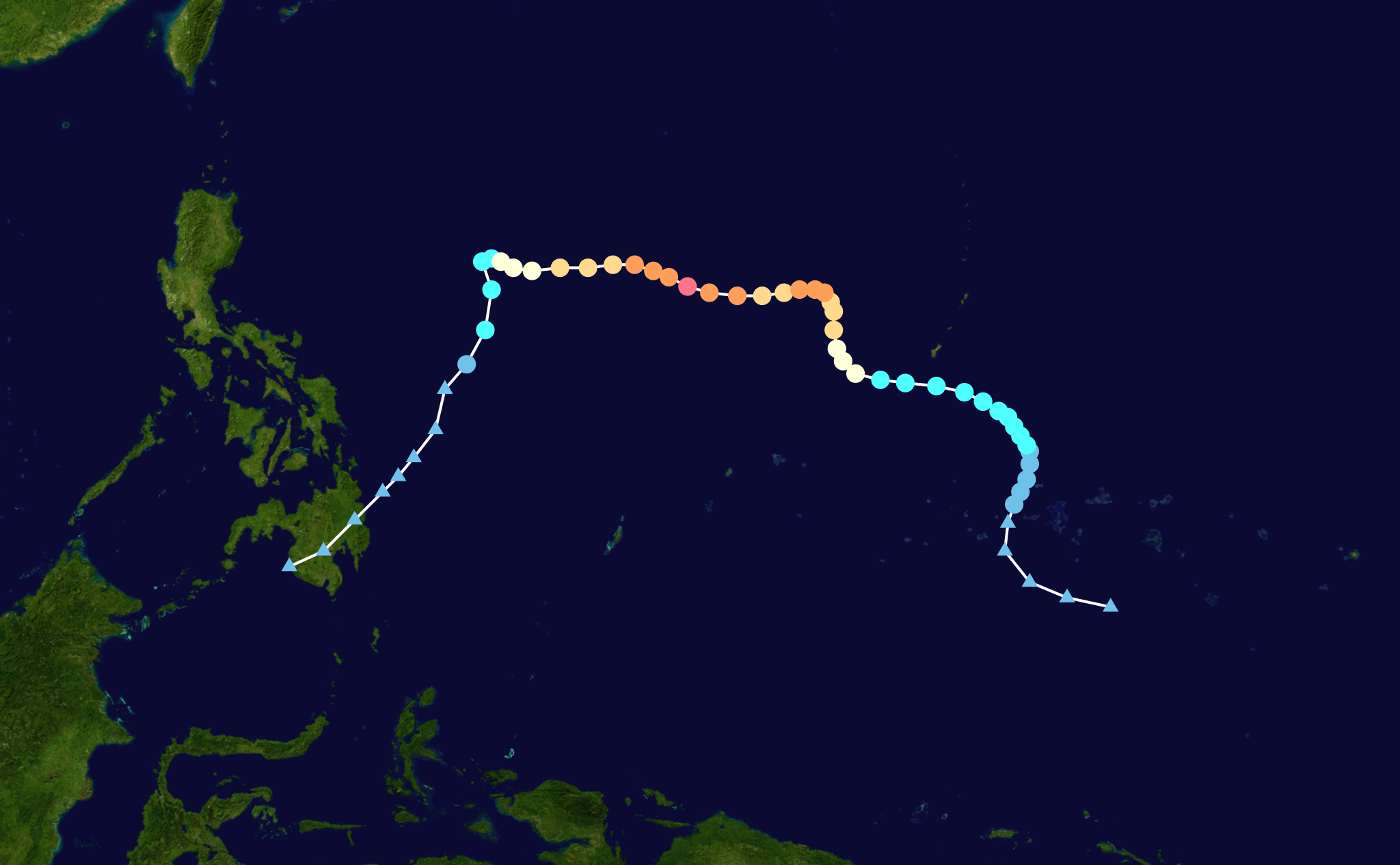
- Duration: December 9 – December 22
- Peak intensity: 185 km/h (115 mph) (10-min); 925 hPa (mbar)

A strong and long lived tropical cyclone for December, the initial low level center for the system formed southwest of Ponape on December 4. By December 7, it had moved southwest of Truk without further development. By the morning of December 10, its structure was improving, and by the next afternoon a tropical depressions had formed. Late on December 11, it had evolved into a tropical storm. A slow moving system, Kit shifted from the northwest to a westerly heading, passing just south of Guam without any further development. Intensification resumed on the following two days reaching its first peak in intensity on December 16. The storm moved sharply northward for a second time at a slow rate of motion before resuming its westward motion due to a northeast surge in the trade winds. Reintensification occurred as the upper trough to its north acted as an outflow channel. Kit reached its peak intensity on the evening of December 17 before increasing westerlies aloft began to weaken the cyclone. On December 20, the surface circulation began to emerge south of its central convection. Thereafter, Kit was steered the low-level flow to the south and southwest as a deck of stratocumulus. On December 21. Kit became a tropical depression once more and by afternoon no longer qualified as a tropical cyclone. Late on December 22, the low level cloud swirl moved into Mindanao before dissipating.

=== Typhoon Lee (Dinang) ===
- Typhoon (JMA)
- Category 2 typhoon (SSHWS)
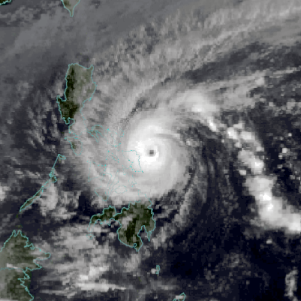
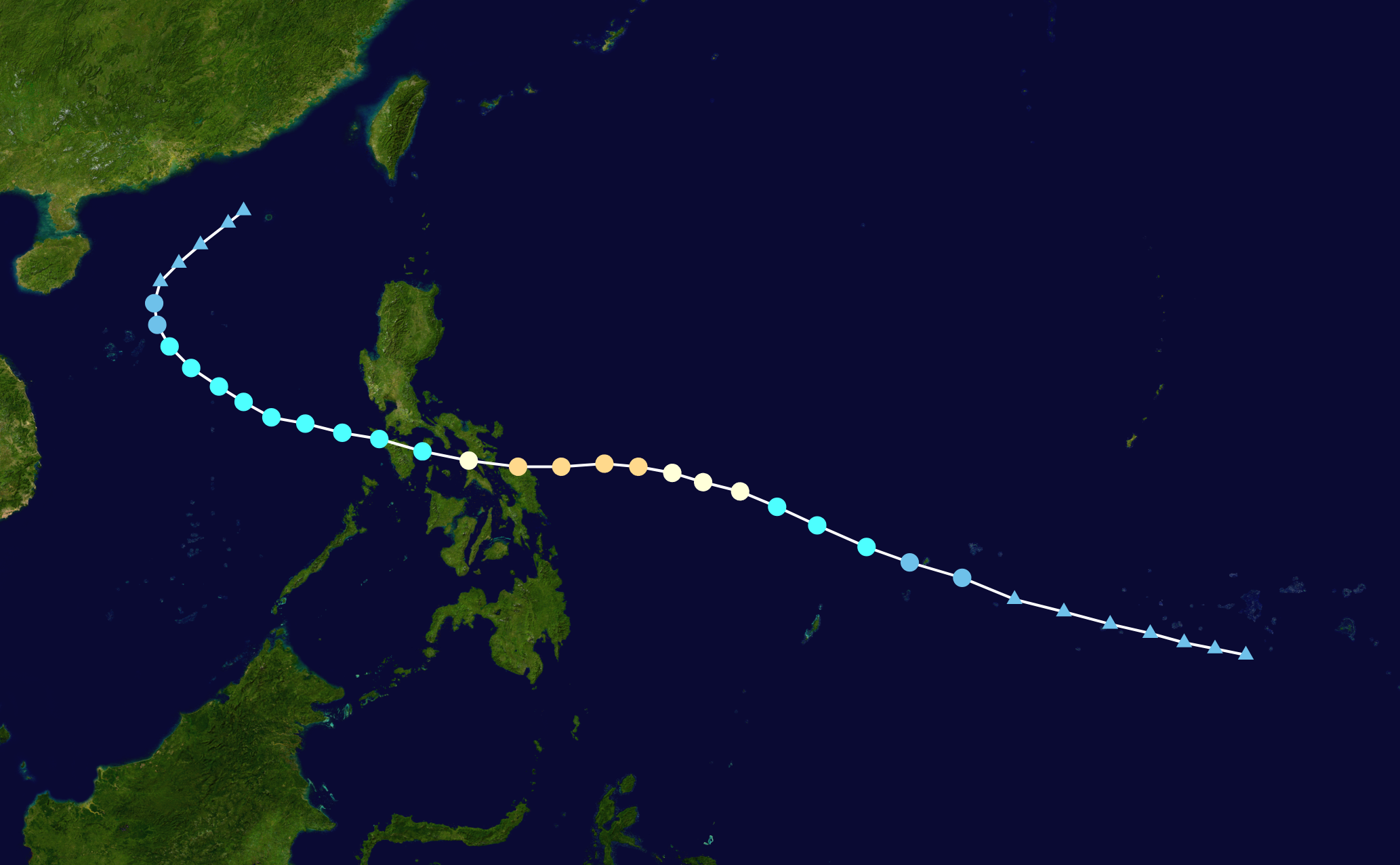
- Duration: December 22 – December 29
- Peak intensity: 150 km/h (90 mph) (10-min); 950 hPa (mbar)

While Kit was dissipating in the western Philippine Sea on December 21, a disturbed area of weather organized west of Truk. Strong northerlies previously diverted into Kit closed off a portion of the monsoon trough, with near gale-force winds wrapping around the convection. Development continued, and by the afternoon of December 22, the system became classified as a tropical depression. Tropical storm status was achieved that night. Moving west-northwest, Lee intensified rapidly into a typhoon on December 23 and reaching its peak intensity early on December 25. Lee made landfall on the Philippines shortly after peaking in intensity, rapid weakening began as Lee crossed the Philippines, and the cyclone was once again a tropical storm by December 26. On December 28, all of the cyclone's convection was removed well east of the circulation center due to moderate to strong westerly vertical wind shear. Turning to the north, Lee dissipated as a tropical cyclone around 280 kilometres (170 mi) south of Hong Kong. The cyclone caused 188 deaths.

== Storm names ==
During the season 28 named tropical cyclones developed in the Western Pacific and were named by the Joint Typhoon Warning Center, when it was determined that they had become tropical storms. These names were contributed to a revised list which started on 1979.

Freda	Gerald	Holly	Ike	June	Kelly	Lynn	Maury	Nina	Odgen	Phyllis	Roy	Susan	Thad
Vanessa	Warren	Agnes	Bill	Clara	Doyle	Elsie	Fabian	Gay	Hazen	Irma	Jeff	Kit	Lee

=== Philippines ===
Atring	Bining	Kuring	Daling	Elang
Goring	Huling	Ibiang	Luming	Miling
Narsing	Openg	Pining	Rubing	Saling
Tasing	Unsing	Walding	Yeyeng	
Auxiliary list
				Anding
Binang	Kadiang	Dinang	Epang (unused)	Gundang (unused)

The Philippine Atmospheric, Geophysical and Astronomical Services Administration uses its own naming scheme for tropical cyclones in their area of responsibility. PAGASA assigns names to tropical depressions that form within their area of responsibility and any tropical cyclone that might move into their area of responsibility. Should the list of names for a given year prove to be insufficient, names are taken from an auxiliary list, the first 6 of which are published each year before the season starts. Names not retired from this list will be used again in the 1985 season. This is the same list used for the 1977 season. PAGASA uses its own naming scheme that starts in the Filipino alphabet, with names of Filipino female names ending with "ng" (A, B, K, D, etc.). Names that were not assigned/going to use are marked in gray.

=== Retirement ===
It is unknown, but possibly due to damage, the name Hazen was retired and was later replaced by Hal, which was first used in the 1985 season.

== Season effects ==
This table will list all the storms that developed in the northwestern Pacific Ocean west of the International Date Line and north of the equator during 1981. It will include their intensity, duration, name, areas affected, deaths, and damage totals. Classification and intensity values will be based on estimations conducted by the JMA, the JTWC, and/or PAGASA. Peak wind speeds are in ten-minute sustained standards unless otherwise noted. All damage figures will be in 1981 USD. Damages and deaths from a storm will include when the storm was a precursor wave or an extratropical low.

Name	Dates	Peak intensity			Areas affected	Damage (USD)	Deaths	Ref(s).
Name	Dates	Category	Wind speed	Pressure	Areas affected	Damage (USD)	Deaths	Ref(s).
Atring	February 14–15	Tropical depression	55 km/h (35 mph)	1006 hPa (29.71 inHg)	None	None	None	
Freda	March 12–18	Very strong typhoon	165 km/h (105 mph)	945 hPa (27.91 inHg)	Marshall Islands, Wake Island	None	None	
Gerald	April 15–23	Severe tropical storm	110 km/h (70 mph)	980 hPa (28.94 inHg)	Caroline Islands, Mariana Islands	None	None	
Holly	April 29 – May 8	Tropical storm	85 km/h (50 mph)	996 hPa (29.42 inHg)	Marshall Islands, Caroline Islands	None	None	
Ike (Bining)	June 8–17	Severe tropical storm	110 km/h (70 mph)	965 hPa (28.50 inHg)	China, Taiwan, Ryukyu Islands	Unknown	8	
TD	June 11–13	Tropical depression	Not specified	1000 hPa (29.53 inHg)	None	None	None	
June (Kuring)	June 15–23	Typhoon	130 km/h (80 mph)	965 hPa (28.50 inHg)	Taiwan, Philippines, Japan	Unknown	None	
TD	June 16	Tropical depression	Not specified	1004 hPa (29.65 inHg)	Philippines	None	None	
Kelly (Daling)	June 27 – July 6	Severe tropical storm	110 km/h (70 mph)	975 hPa (28.79 inHg)	Philippines, South China, Vietnam	$7.92 million	192	
Lynn (Elang)	July 2–7	Severe tropical storm	100 km/h (65 mph)	985 hPa (29.09 inHg)	Philippines, South China	None	22	
Goring	July 7–9	Tropical depression	55 km/h (35 mph)	1004 hPa (29.65 inHg)	None	None	None	
TD	July 15–17	Tropical depression	Not specified	1004 hPa (29.65 inHg)	Philippines, Taiwan	None	None	
Maury (Huling)	July 17–21	Severe tropical storm	95 km/h (60 mph)	985 hPa (29.09 inHg)	Taiwan, Ryukyu Islands, China	$24,000	38	
TD	July 20–22	Tropical depression	Not specified	1004 hPa (29.65 inHg)	None	None	None	
Nina (Ibiang)	July 21–24	Tropical storm	75 km/h (45 mph)	992 hPa (29.29 inHg)	China	None	None	
Ogden	July 26 – August 1	Severe tropical storm	95 km/h (60 mph)	975 hPa (28.79 inHg)	Japan, South Korea	$54.4 million	None	
Luming	July 31 – August 1	Tropical depression	45 km/h (30 mph)	1000 hPa (29.53 inHg)	None	None	None	
11W	August 1–2	Tropical storm	75 km/h (45 mph)	988 hPa (29.17 inHg)	Mariana Islands	None	None	
TD	August 2–6	Tropical depression	55 km/h (35 mph)	992 hPa (29.29 inHg)	Mariana Islands	None	None	
Phyllis	August 2–5	Severe tropical storm	100 km/h (65 mph)	975 hPa (28.79 inHg)	None	None	None	
Roy (Miling)	August 2–11	Tropical storm	85 km/h (50 mph)	985 hPa (29.09 inHg)	None	None	None	
Susan	August 6–5	Severe tropical storm	110 km/h (70 mph)	980 hPa (28.94 inHg)	None	None	None	
TD	August 6–7	Tropical depression	Not specified	1004 hPa (29.25 inHg)	Mariana Islands	None	None	
TD	August 8–9	Tropical depression	55 km/h (35 mph)	1002 hPa (29.59 inHg)	Philippines	None	None	
TD	August 14–16	Tropical depression	Not specified	998 hPa (29.47 inHg)	Mariana Islands	None	None	
Thad (Openg)	August 15–23	Typhoon	130 km/h (80 mph)	955 hPa (28.20 inHg)	Japan	Unknown	31	
Vanessa	August 16–20	Severe tropical storm	95 km/h (60 mph)	980 hPa (28.94 inHg)	None	None	None	
Warren	August 16–20	Tropical storm	85 km/h (50 mph)	985 hPa (29.09 inHg)	Hainan Island, Vietnam	None	None	
TD	August 17	Tropical depression	Not specified	1002 hPa (29.59 inHg)	None	None	None	
TD	August 17	Tropical depression	Not specified	1000 hPa (29.53 inHg)	None	None	None	
TD	August 25	Tropical depression	Not specified	1006 hPa (29.71 inHg)	None	None	None	
Agnes (Pining)	August 25 – September 3	Typhoon	150 km/h (90 mph)	950 hPa (28.05 inHg)	Mariana Islands, Japan, East China, Korean Peninsula	$135 million	159	
Bill	September 1–23	Typhoon	140 km/h (85 mph)	960 hPa (28.35 inHg)	None	None	None	
TD	September 2–4	Tropical depression	Not specified	1006 hPa (29.71 inHg)	None	None	None	
Clara (Rubing)	September 13–23	Very strong typhoon	185 km/h (115 mph)	925 hPa (27.32 inHg)	Caroline Islands, Philippines, China, Taiwan	Unknown	141	
Doyle	September 19–23	Typhoon	130 km/h (80 mph)	965 hPa (28.50 inHg)	None	None	None	
TD	September 22–24	Tropical depression	Not specified	1008 hPa (29.77 inHg)	Ryukyu Islands	None	None	
TD	September 22–24	Tropical depression	Not specified	1000 hPa (29.53 inHg)	South China	None	None	
Elsie (Tasing)	September 23 – October 2	Violent typhoon	220 km/h (140 mph)	895 hPa (26.43 inHg)	Caroline Islands, Mariana Islands	None	None	
Saling	September 24–27	Tropical depression	55 km/h (35 mph)	1006 hPa (29.71 inHg)	Philippines	None	None	
Fabian (Unsing)	October 10–15	Tropical storm	85 km/h (50 mph)	994 hPa (29.35 inHg)	Philippines, Vietnam	None	None	
Gay (Walding)	October 14–23	Typhoon	155 km/h (100 mph)	950 hPa (28.05 inHg)	Caroline Islands, Mariana Islands, Japan	None	None	
TD	October 15	Tropical depression	Not specified	998 hPa (29.47 inHg)	Caroline Islands	None	None	
TD	October 21	Tropical depression	Not specified	1006 hPa (29.71 inHg)	Caroline Islands	None	None	
TD	November 6–9	Tropical depression	Not specified	1006 hPa (29.71 inHg)	Mariana Islands	None	None	
TD	November 9–11	Tropical depression	Not specified	1002 hPa (29.59 inHg)	Vietnam	None	None	
Hazen (Yeyeng)	November 13–21	Typhoon	130 km/h (80 mph)	955 hPa (28.20 inHg)	Caroline Islands, Mariana Islands, Philippines, South China	Unknown	Unknown	
Irma (Anding)	November 18–27	Violent typhoon	205 km/h (125 mph)	905 hPa (26.72 inHg)	Caroline Islands, Mariana Islands, Philippines, Taiwan, Ryukyu Islands	$63.3 million	595	
Jeff (Binang)	November 20–26	Tropical storm	75 km/h (45 mph)	1000 hPa (29.53 inHg)	Caroline Islands	None	None	
TD	December 7–8	Tropical depression	Not specified	1004 hPa (29.65 inHg)	Vietnam	None	None	
Kit (Kadiang)	December 9–22	Very strong typhoon	185 km/h (115 mph)	925 hPa (27.32 inHg)	Caroline Islands, Mariana Islands	None	None	
Lee (Dinang)	December 22–29	Typhoon	150 km/h (90 mph)	950 hPa (28.05 inHg)	Caroline Islands, Mariana Islands, Philippines, South China	$74 million	188	
Season aggregates
52 systems	February 14 – December 29, 1981		220 km/h (140 mph)	895 hPa (26.43 inHg)		$280 million	1,264	

== See also ==
- List of Pacific typhoon seasons
- 1981 Pacific hurricane season
- 1981 Atlantic hurricane season
- 1981 North Indian Ocean cyclone season
- Australian cyclone seasons: 1980–81, 1981–82
- South Pacific cyclone seasons: 1980–81, 1981–82
- South-West Indian Ocean cyclone seasons: 1980–81, 1981–82
