= List of storms named Clara =

The name Clara has been used for twelve tropical cyclones worldwide: one in the Atlantic Ocean, one in the East Pacific Ocean, and ten in the West Pacific Ocean.

In the Atlantic:

- Hurricane Clara (1977)

In the East Pacific:

- Tropical Storm Clara (1959)

In the West Pacific:

- Typhoon Clara (1950) (T5017)
- Typhoon Clara (1955) (T5505, 07W)
- Typhoon Clara (1961) (T6126, 63W)
- Typhoon Clara (1964) (T6427, 35W, Dorang)
- Typhoon Clara (1967) (T6708, 08W, Ising)
- Typhoon Clara (1970) (T7012, 13W)
- Tropical Storm Clara (1973) (T7303, 03W)
- Tropical Storm Clara (1976) (T7614, 14W)
- Typhoon Clara (1981) (T8120, 24W, Rubing) – powerful typhoon that affected the Philippines, Taiwan, and South China
- Tropical Storm Clara (1988) (T8810, 10W)

== See also ==
- Cyclone Clare (2006) – an Australian region tropical cyclone with a similar name
