= Typhoon Clara (1981) =

Pacific typhoon in 1981

Typhoon Clara (Rubing)
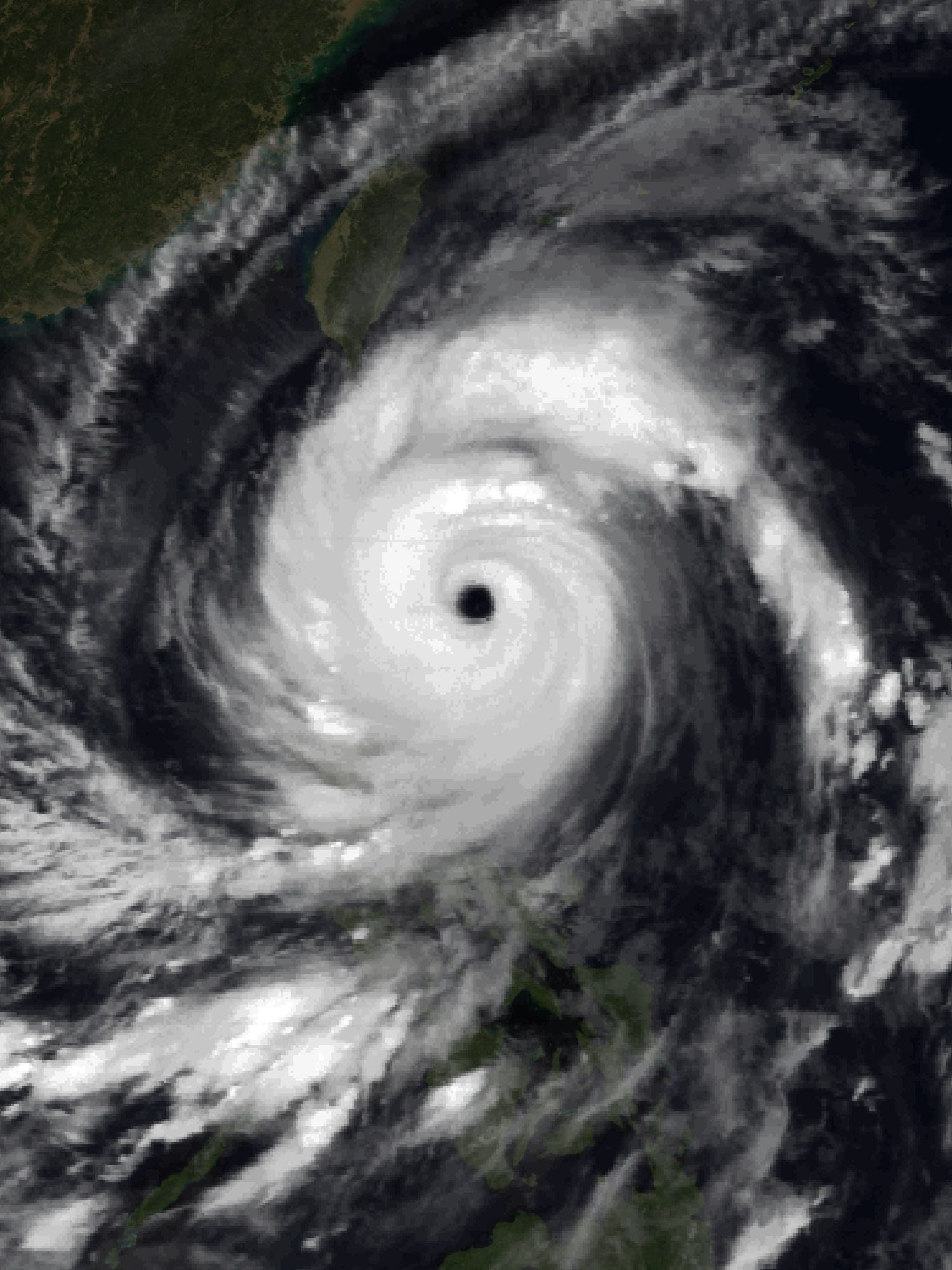
- Typhoon Clara at peak intensity on September 19

Meteorological history
- Formed: September 13, 1981
- Remnant low: September 21, 1981
- Dissipated: October 2, 1981

Very strong typhoon
- 10-minute sustained (JMA)
- Highest winds: 185 km/h (115 mph)
- Lowest pressure: 925 hPa (mbar); 27.32 inHg

Category 4-equivalent typhoon
- 1-minute sustained (SSHWS/JTWC)
- Highest winds: 220 km/h (140 mph)
- Lowest pressure: 924 hPa (mbar); 27.29 inHg

Overall effects
- Fatalities: 196 total
- Damage: $13.4 million (1981 USD)
- Areas affected: Philippines; Taiwan; South China
- IBTrACS
- Part of the 1981 Pacific typhoon season

Typhoon Clara, known in the Philippines as Typhoon Rubing, left flooding in the northern Philippines and southern China during September 1981. An area of disturbed weather was first detected on September 11 near Ponape. After moving westward, the system gradually became better organized and thunderstorm activity increased. On September 16, the system attained tropical storm status. Two days later, Clara attained typhoon intensity and subsequently began to deepen at a faster rate. On September 19, Clara reached maximum intensity, before making landfall along the northern tip of Luzon. Clara steadily weakened after interacting with land, but by late on September 20, Clara leveled off in intensity over the South China Sea. The next day, Clara moved ashore to the east-northeast of Hong Kong while still at typhoon intensity before rapidly dissipating over land.

In the Philippines, 55 people perished. A total of 7,125 homes were damaged and 1,195 houses were destroyed, which left nearly 4,000 people homeless in one province alone. Damage was estimated at $13.4 million (1981 USD), mostly from crops. Offshore, two ships were wrecked, leading to 79 fatalities, although 48 others were rescued. Across China, almost 150,000 ha (370,660 acres) of farmland were flooded or destroyed, several thousand individuals lost their homes, and 62 people were killed.

== Meteorological history ==
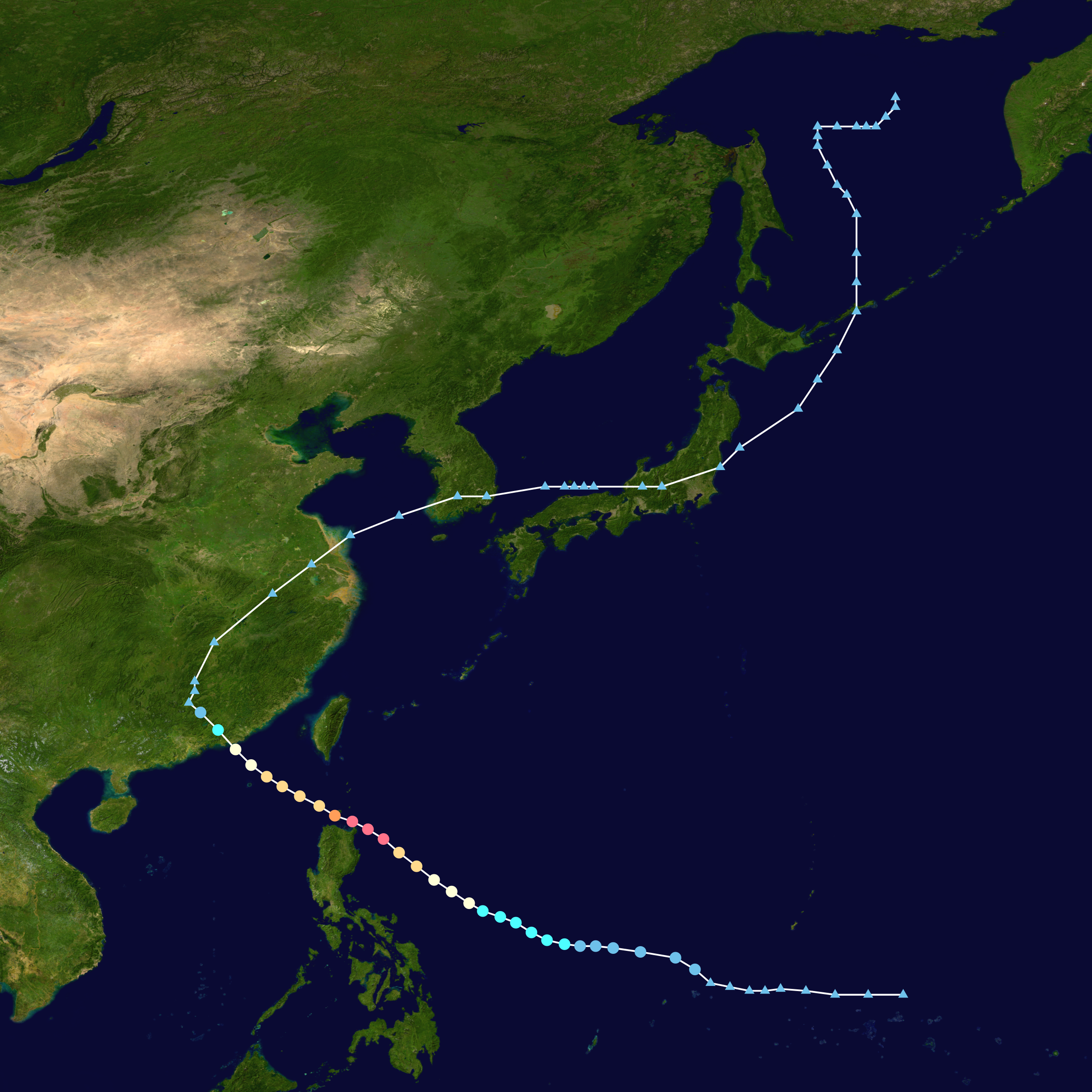
Map plotting the storm's track and intensity, according to the Saffir–Simpson scale Map key Saffir–Simpson scale Tropical depression (≤38 mph, ≤62 km/h) Tropical storm (39–73 mph, 63–118 km/h) Category 1 (74–95 mph, 119–153 km/h) Category 2 (96–110 mph, 154–177 km/h) Category 3 (111–129 mph, 178–208 km/h) Category 4 (130–156 mph, 209–251 km/h) Category 5 (≥157 mph, ≥252 km/h) Unknown Storm type Tropical cyclone Subtropical cyclone Extratropical cyclone, remnant low, tropical disturbance, or monsoon depression

An area of disturbed weather was first detected by satellite imagery on the afternoon of September 11 near Ponape embedded in the monsoon trough. The disturbance tracked westward, with its development aided by a tropical upper tropospheric trough that provided divergence aloft. Despite some wind shear, thunderstorm activity increased in organization and coverage by the afternoon on September 13. At 18:00 UTC, the Japan Meteorological Agency (JMA) started monitoring the cyclone, classifying it as a tropical depression. (Note: The Japan Meteorological Agency is the official Regional Specialized Meteorological Center for the western Pacific Ocean.) Less than two hours later, a Tropical Cyclone Formation Alert (TCFA) was issued by the Joint Typhoon Warning Center (JTWC). Thunderstorm activity continued to increase as the shear relaxed, and at 19:23 UTC on September 14, the TCFA was re-issued. After passing 390 km (240 mi) south of Guam, the JTWC initiated warnings on the system early on September 15. Eighteen hours later, the JTWC classified the system as a tropical storm. At 18:00 UTC on September 16, the JMA did the same. (Note: Wind estimates from the JMA and most other basins throughout the world are sustained over 10 minutes, while estimates from the United States-based Joint Typhoon Warning Center are sustained over 1 minute. 10-minute winds are about 1.14 times the amount of 1-minute winds.)

Upon becoming a tropical storm, the JTWC initially expected Clara to track into Luzon. At 18:00 UTC on September 17, the JMA declared Clara a severe tropical storm. The same day, the Philippine Atmospheric, Geophysical and Astronomical Services Administration (PAGASA) also started monitoring the storm and assigned it with the local name Rubing. By September 18, the JTWC had modified its forecast and called for the storm to re-curve out to sea in response to a weakness in a ridge to its north, but this weakness was only enough to enable a west-northwest track. After satellite images indicated that Clara developed an eye, both the JTWC and JMA reported that Clara had intensified into a typhoon, and subsequently began to rapidly intensify. Midday on September 19, the JTWC raised the intensity of Clara to 210 km/h (130 mph), equal to low-end Category 4 intensity on the United States-based Saffir–Simpson hurricane wind scale (SSHWS). At this time, hurricane hunters measured a barometric pressure of 924 mbar (27.3 inHg). However, the JMA estimated a slightly higher pressure of 925 mbar (27.3 inHg). At 18:00 UTC on September 19, the JTWC estimated a peak wind speed of 225 km/h (140 mph) while the JMA reported a peak intensity of 185 km/h (115 mph). At 22:00 UTC, the typhoon briefly made landfall on the northern tip of Luzon at the same intensity, with the storm passing approximately 40 km (25 mi) north of Calayan.

After entering the South China Sea, the typhoon began to move northwest, but a ridge to its north prevented re-curvature. The storm weakened some due to land interaction, but leveled off in intensity late on September 20. At 12:00 the next day, Clara made landfall around 260 km (160 mi) east-northwest of Hong Kong, or near Shanwei, with the JTWC and JMA reporting winds of 145 and 135 km/h (90 and 85 mph) respectively. Clara rapidly dissipated over the hilly terrain of China, but the JMA did not cease tracking its remnants until October 2, after the storm turned to the north and reached 56°N.

== Impact ==
Near where the storm made landfall in northern Luzon, winds of 97 km/h (60 mph) and a pressure of 977.1 mbar (28.85 inHg) was reported. In the city of Baguio, several small landslides occurred. There, a total of 36 families sought shelter in higher ground due to floodwaters 2.4 m (8 ft) high while many towns in the surrounding area were isolated. Throughout the Cagayan province, 3,725 people were rendered homeless and property damage totaled $1.8 million. Nationwide, 55 people died. Nearly 48,000 people sought shelter. A total of 7,125 homes were damaged and 1,195 houses were destroyed. Damage was estimated at $13.4 million, (Note: All currencies are converted to United States Dollars using Philippines Measuring worth with an exchange rate of the year 1981.) with $10.9 million from crops, $2 million from public infrastructure, and roughly $500,000 from private infrastructure.

Offshore Calayan Island, the 1,600-short-ton (1,450 t) vessel Datu Kalantiaw was wrecked by a coral reef, with 19 of the 97 people necessitating rescue. A total of 52 bodies from the shipwreck were recovered and the remaining others were presumed dead. Additionally, the 1,000 short tons (905 t) ship Sweet Trip sank offshore Zamboanga del Norte Province; 29 of the 30 people aboard were rescued and the remaining person was presumed dead. Twelve victims sustained injures. To search for the missing, authorities dispatched four helicopters, one C-130 transport plane, and an ammunition ship. The United States Navy also provided some assistance initially, but gave up searching on September 23.

While the typhoon passed 50 nmi (93 km) northeast of Pratas Island (Tungsha/Dongsha), Taiwan (ROC), winds of 45 knots and a pressure of 984.7 mbar (29.08 inHg) were measured. Across China, 62 people were killed. In the Fujian province, nearly 20,235 ha (50,000 acres) of rice paddies and 121,405 ha (300,000 acres) of sugar cane were damaged. Many highways were impassable and there was widespread loss of communication. About 8,500 ha (21,000 acres) of farmland were flooded in Shantou alone, where winds of 110 km/h (70 mph) were recorded. Several thousand people were homeless due to the flooding. In Hong Kong, a No 1. hurricane signal was issued on September 20. The next day, the signal was increased to a No 3. hurricane signal. All signals were dropped after the typhoon moved inland. On Cheung Chau, a peak wind speed of 58 km/h (36 mph) and a peak wind gust of 94 km/h (58 mph) was reported. Tate's Cairn observed 23.2 mm (0.91 in) of rain over a 24-hour period, the highest in the region. Local ferry service and air traffic were disrupted by the typhoon and a few signs were knocked down, but there were no serious reports of damage in the vicinity of Hong Kong. Further north, in Taiwan, up to 560 mm (22 in) of rain fell in some places, but there was no serious damage.

== See also ==
- Other tropical cyclones named Clara
- Typhoon Lynn (1987)
