= 1959 Pacific hurricane season =

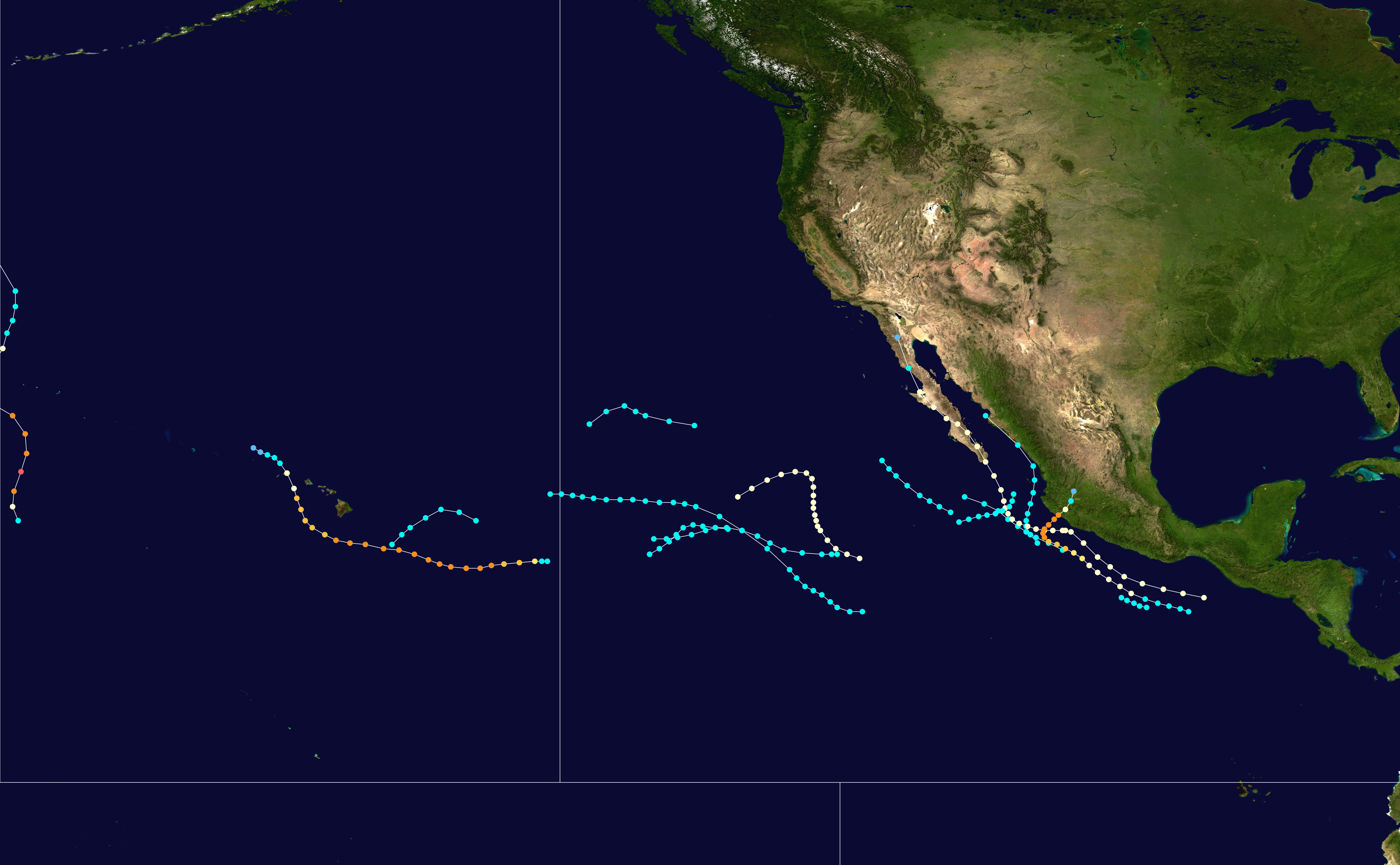
- Season summary map

Seasonal boundaries
- First system formed: June 8, 1959
- Last system dissipated: October 29, 1959

Strongest storm
- Name: Patsy
  - Maximum winds: 175 mph (280 km/h) (1-minute sustained)
  - Lowest pressure: 930 mbar (hPa; 27.46 inHg)

Seasonal statistics
- Total depressions: 15
- Total storms: 15
- Hurricanes: 5
- Major hurricanes (Cat. 3+): 3
- Total fatalities: 1,800 total (Deadliest Pacific hurricane season on record)
- Total damage: ~ $286 million (1959 USD)

Related articles
- 1959 Atlantic hurricane season; 1959 Pacific typhoon season; 1950s North Indian Ocean cyclone seasons

The 1959 Pacific hurricane season saw 15 storms develop, 5 of which became hurricanes, and 3 of those became major hurricanes. The season officially started on May 15, 1959 in the Eastern Pacific, and ended on November 30, 1959.

The strongest storm was Hurricane Patsy, the first Category 5 hurricane recorded in the Central Pacific basin, which reached 175 miles per hour (282 km/h) winds. Also notable was Hurricane Dot, which made landfall on Kauai, Hawaii as a Category 1 hurricane. The deadliest storm of the season was the Mexico hurricane, which made landfall in Mexico as a Category 4 hurricane and killed 1,800 people.

== Systems ==
=== Tropical Storm One ===
- Tropical storm (SSHWS)
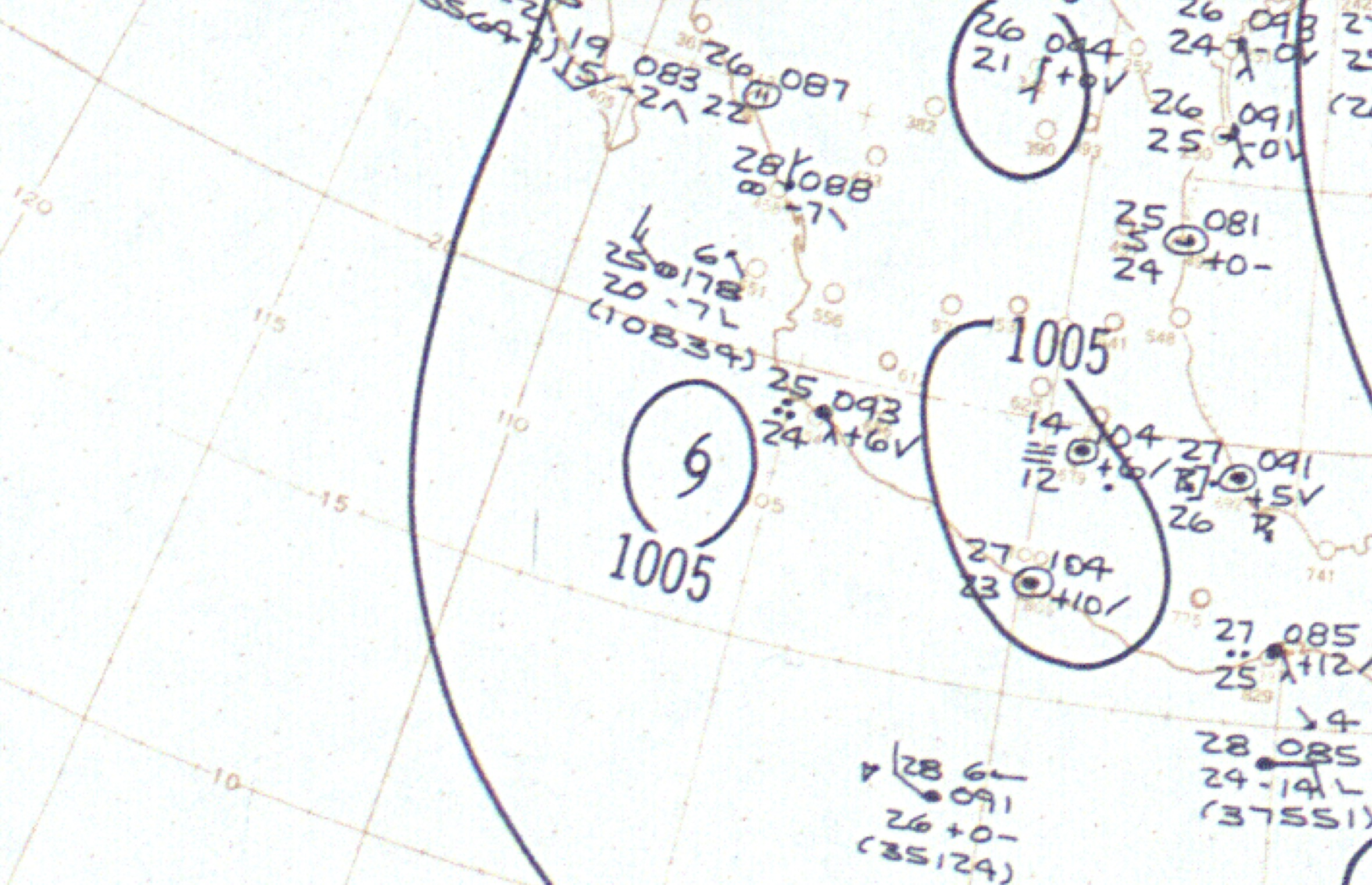
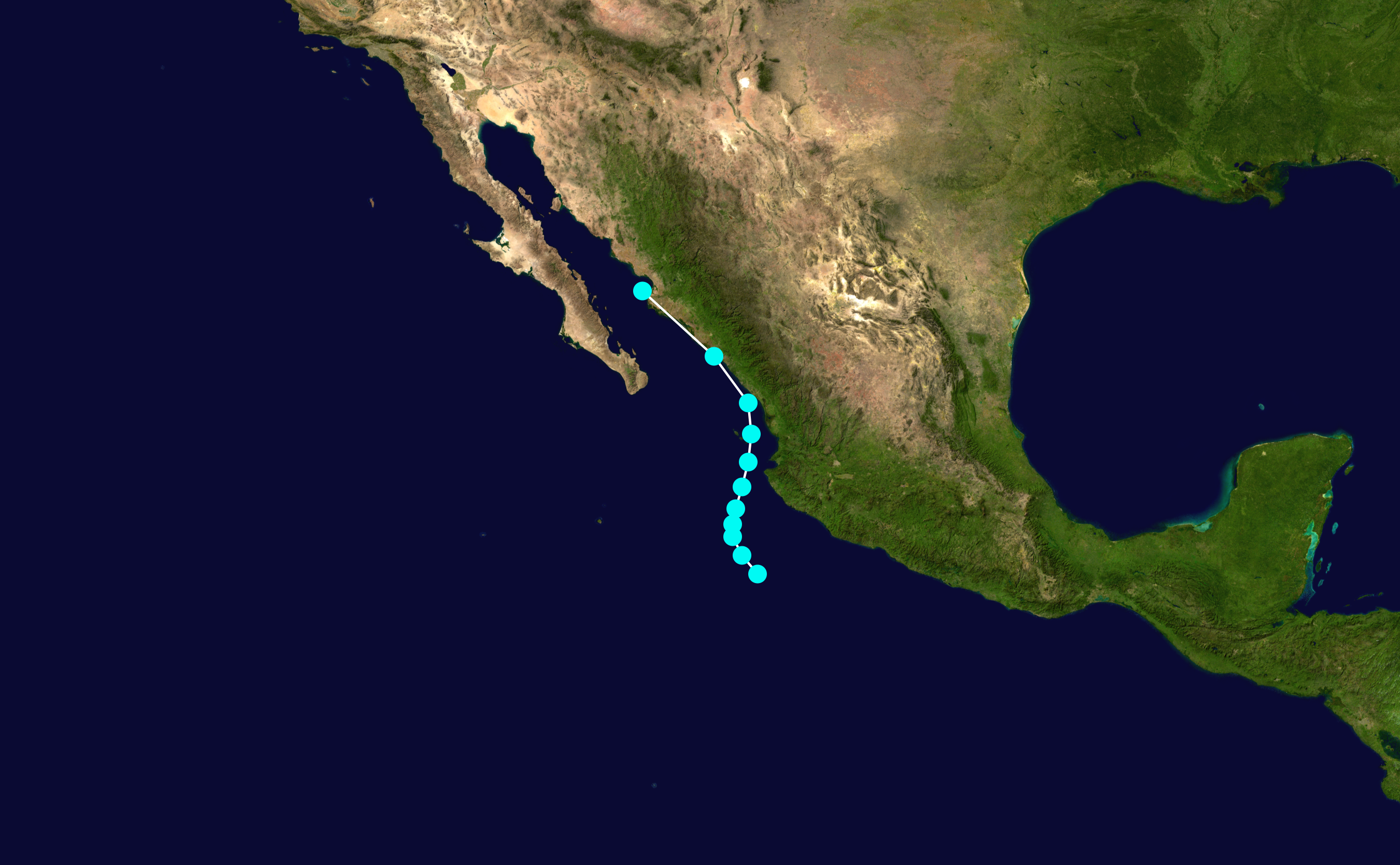
- Duration: June 9 – June 12
- Peak intensity: 45 mph (75 km/h) (1-min); 1003 mbar (hPa)

A 55 mph (75 km/h) tropical storm was first located on June 9 while west of Mexico. It did not strengthen any further as it paralleled the Mexican coast. It made landfall near Los Mochis, Mexico on June 12 and dissipated shortly afterward. There are no reports of damages or deaths due to the storm.

=== Tropical Storm Two ===
- Tropical storm (SSHWS)
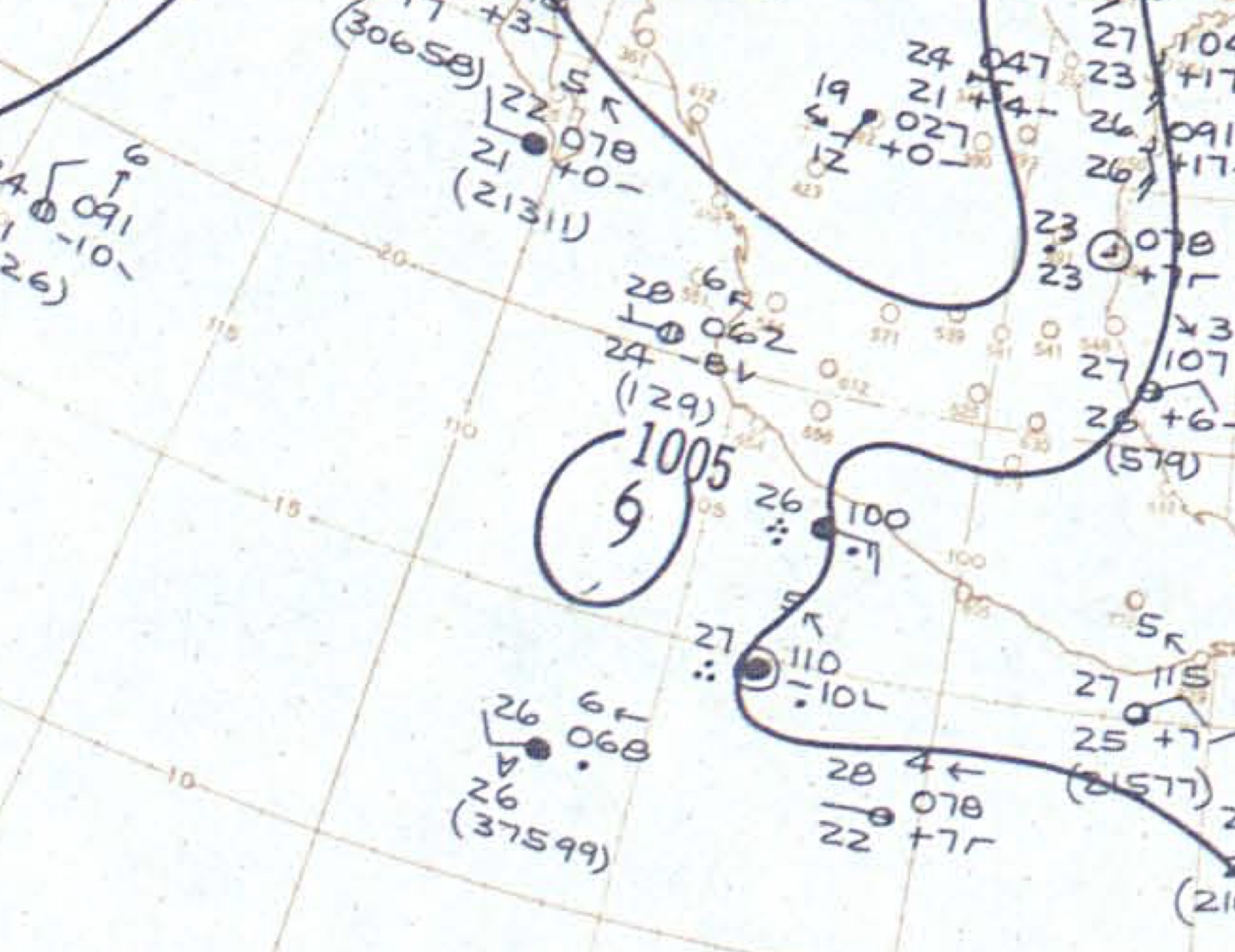
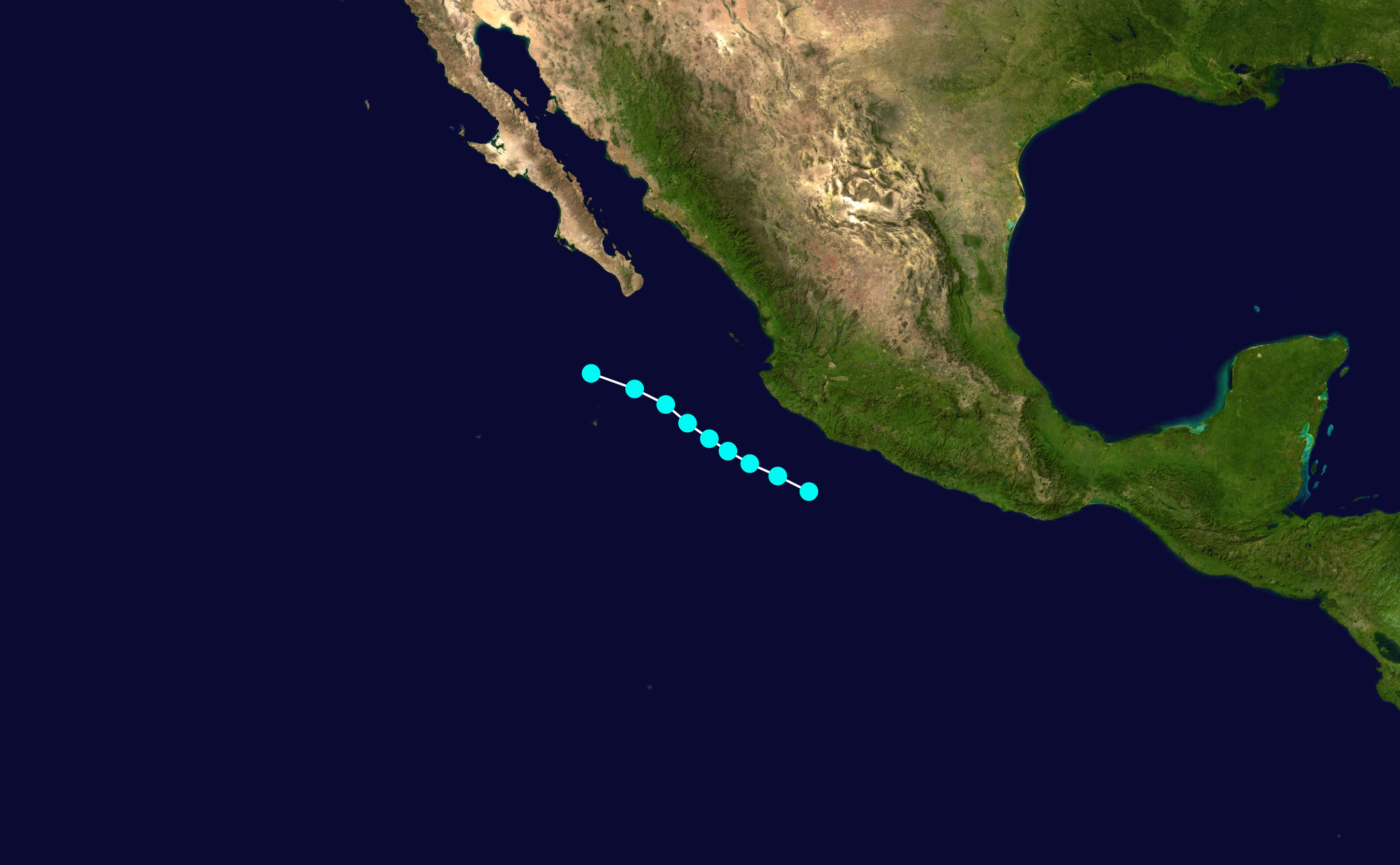
- Duration: June 25 – June 27
- Peak intensity: 50 mph (85 km/h) (1-min); 1006 mbar (hPa)

On June 25, a small tropical storm developed off the coast of Mexico. It attained winds of 50 mph at its peak. It later dissipated on June 27.

=== Tropical Storm Clara ===
- Tropical storm (SSHWS)
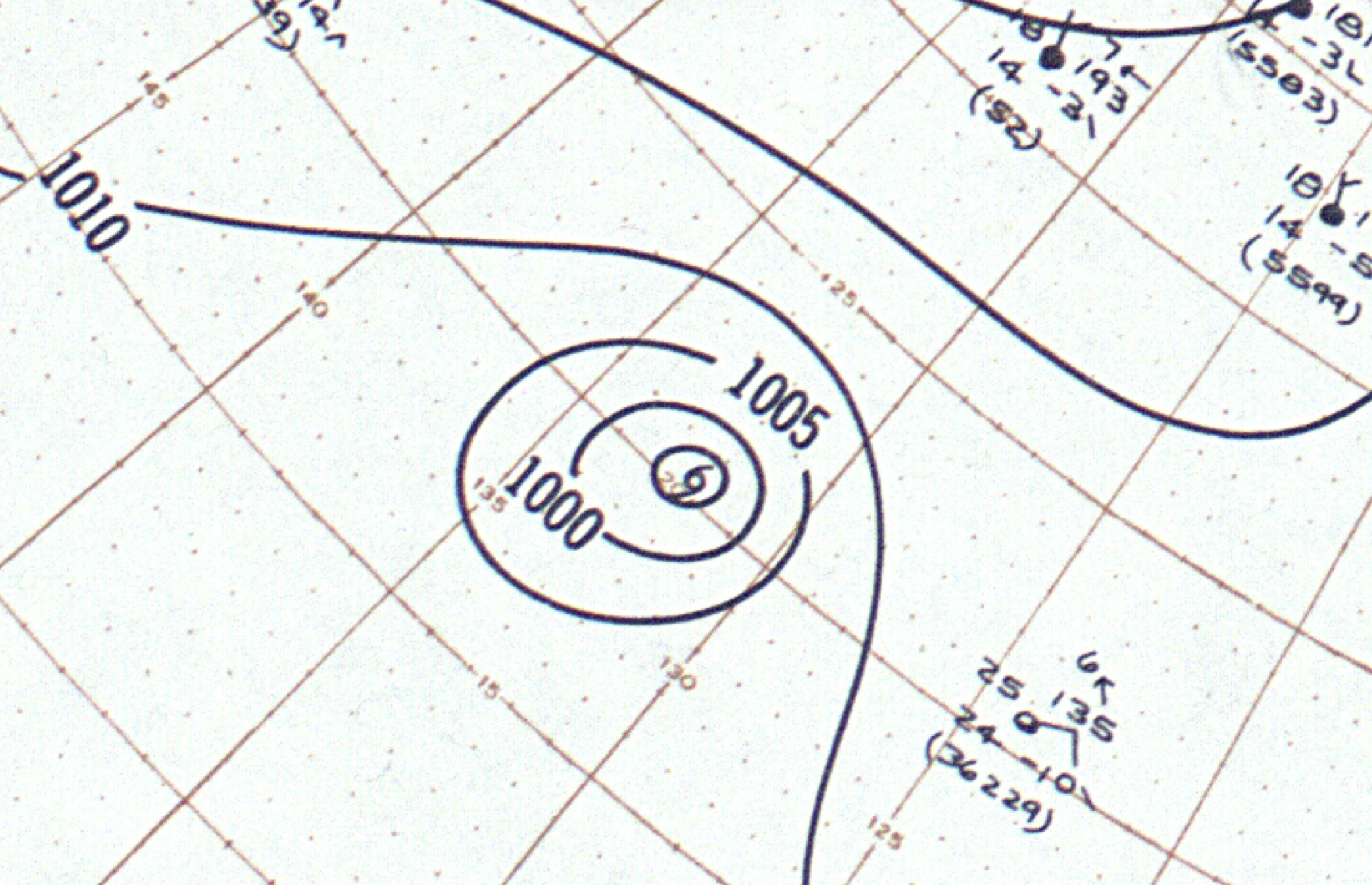
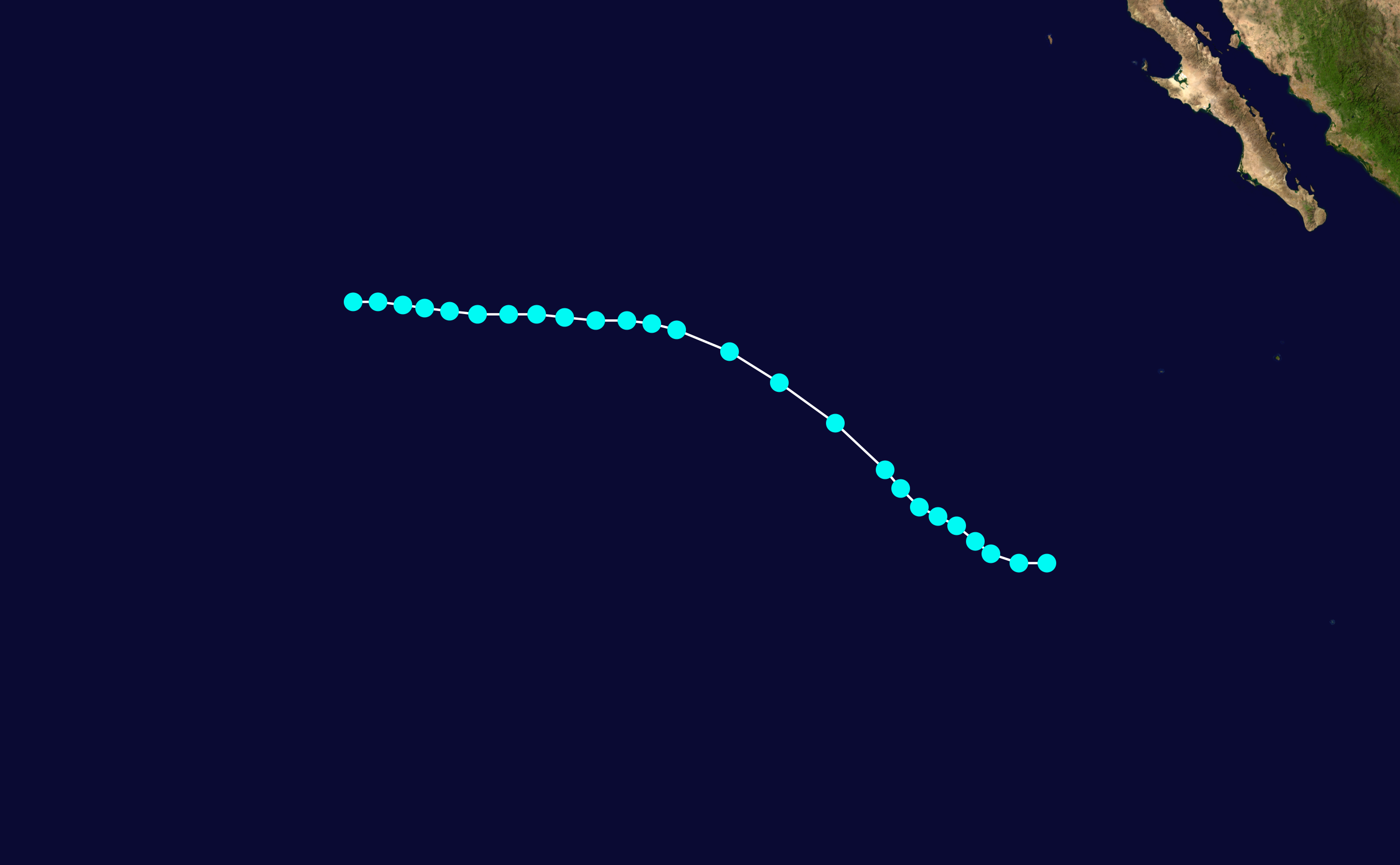
- Duration: July 16 – July 22
- Peak intensity: 50 mph (85 km/h) (1-min); 977 mbar (hPa)

After a month of inactivity, a tropical storm formed several thousands of miles south-west of the southern tip of Baja California. This tropical storm began moving north-westwards while keeping its intensity. Winds peaked at 50 mph (85 km/h). On July 19, this tropical storm began moving west and finally dissipated 3 days later.

The name Clara was assigned from the North Pacific Typhoon name list.

=== Tropical Storm Four ===
- Tropical storm (SSHWS)
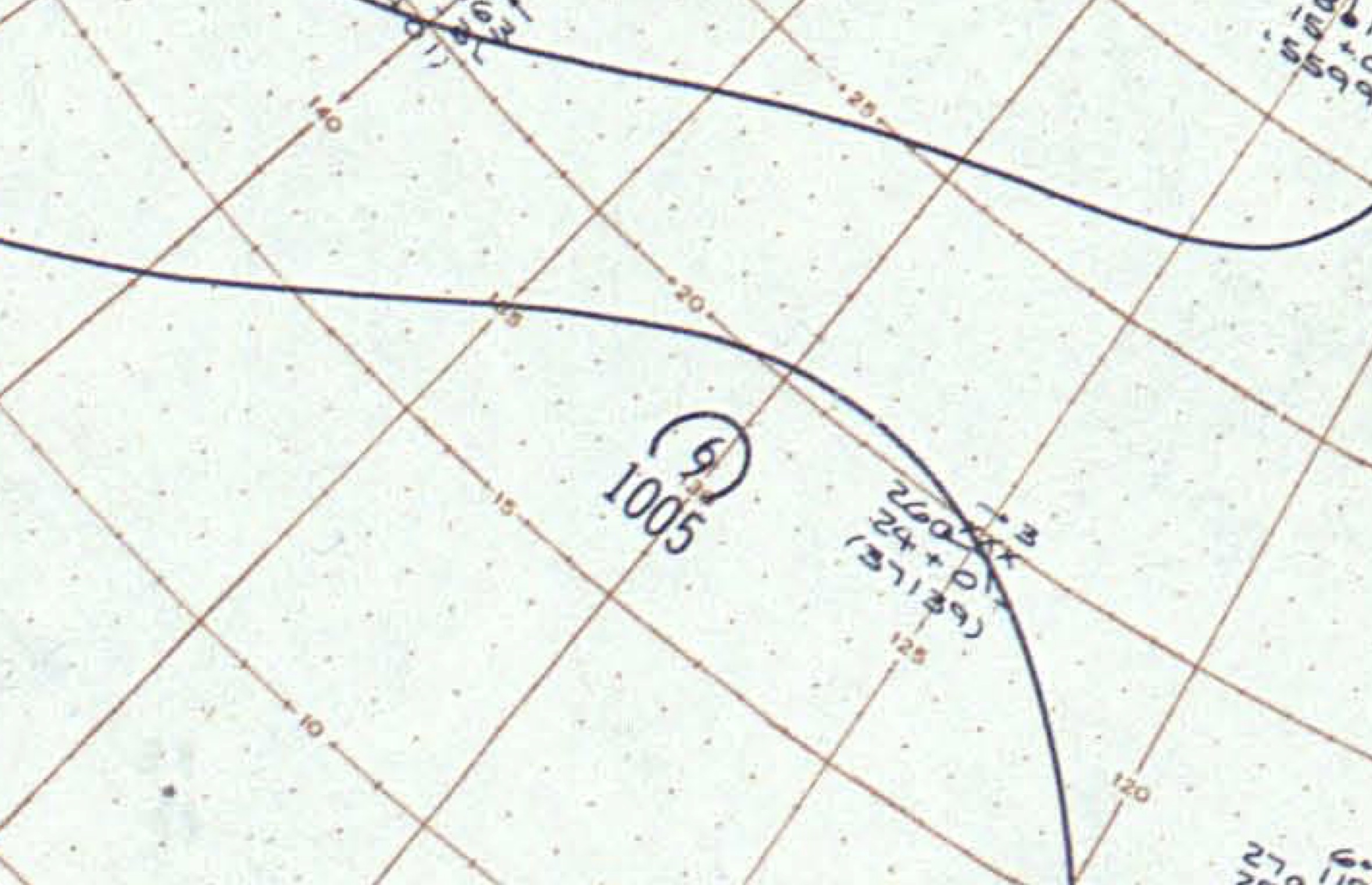
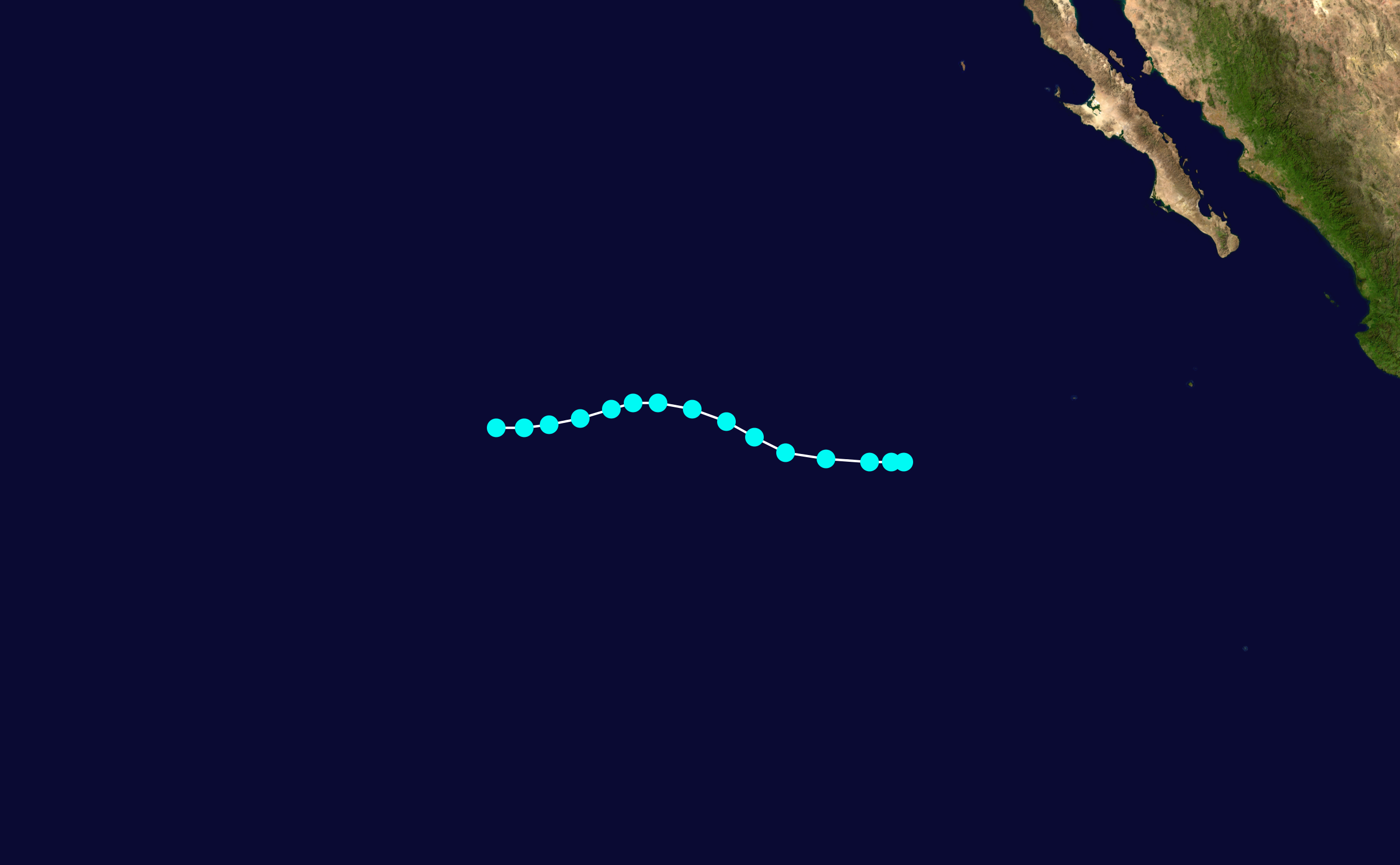
- Duration: July 22 – July 25
- Peak intensity: 50 mph (85 km/h) (1-min); 1004 mbar (hPa)

Soon after Tropical Storm Clara dissipated, a new tropical storm formed in the open Pacific. Tropical Storm Four moved west, then west-north-west. Like the previous two tropical storms, it did not affect land. It dissipated on July 25.

=== Tropical Storm Five ===
- Tropical storm (SSHWS)
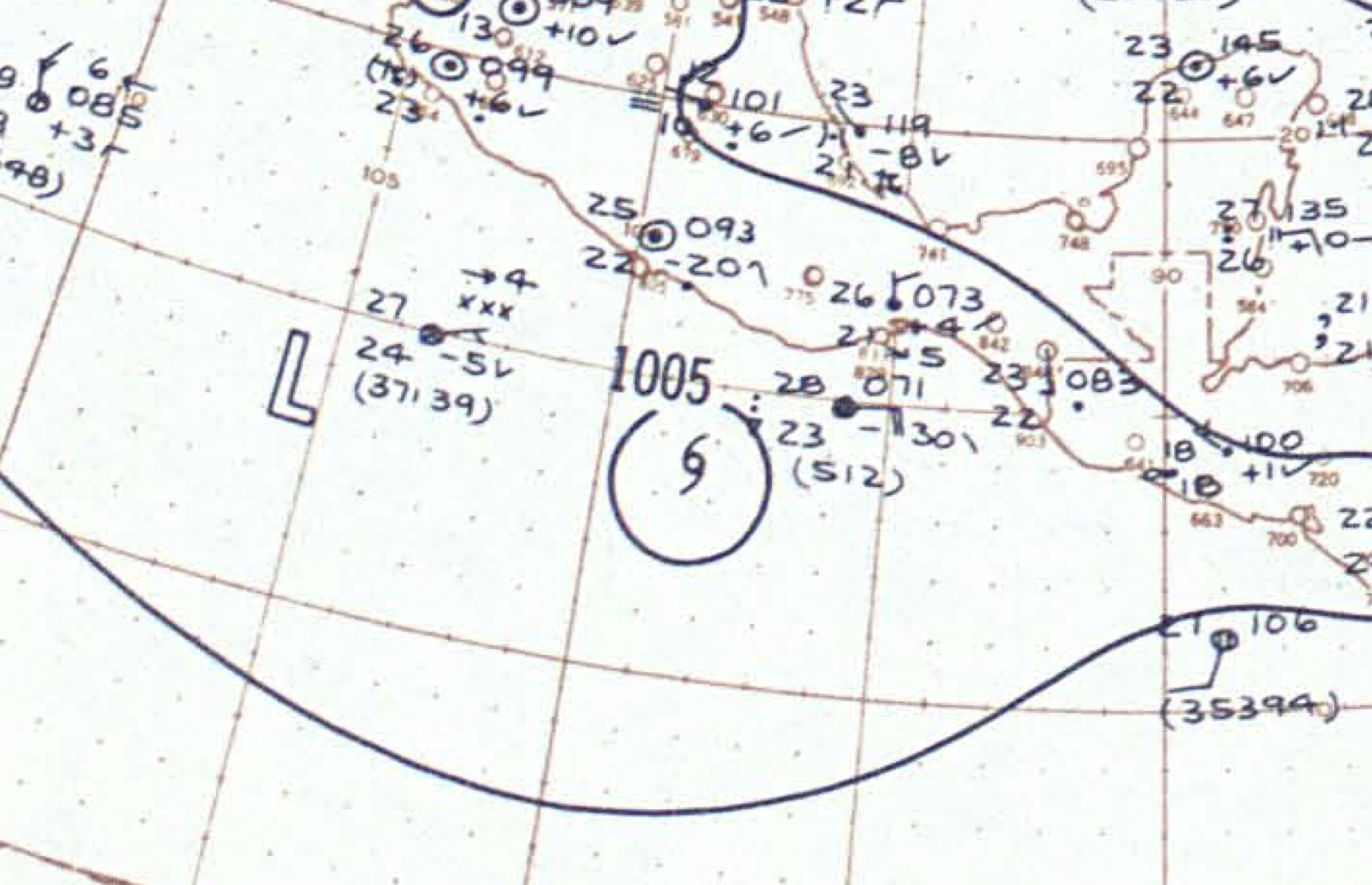
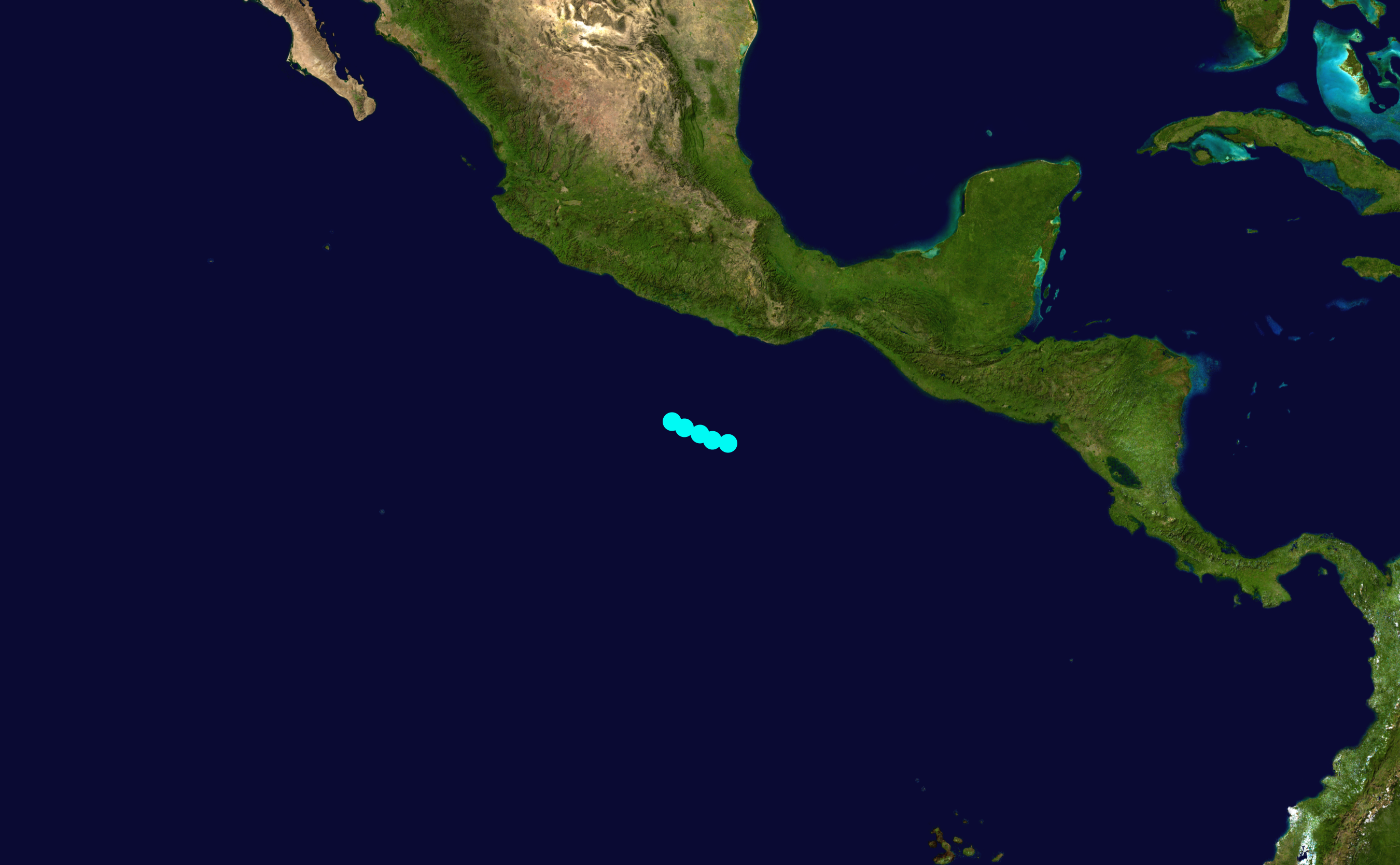
- Duration: July 29 – July 30
- Peak intensity: 45 mph (75 km/h) (1-min);

Tropical Storm Five was a short-lived tropical storm, only lasting a day. It peaked at a relatively weak 45 mph (75 km/h). It moved parallel to the Mexican coast.

=== Hurricane Dot ===
- Category 4 hurricane (SSHWS)
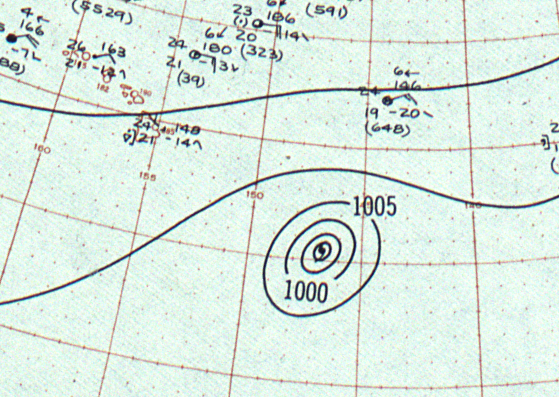
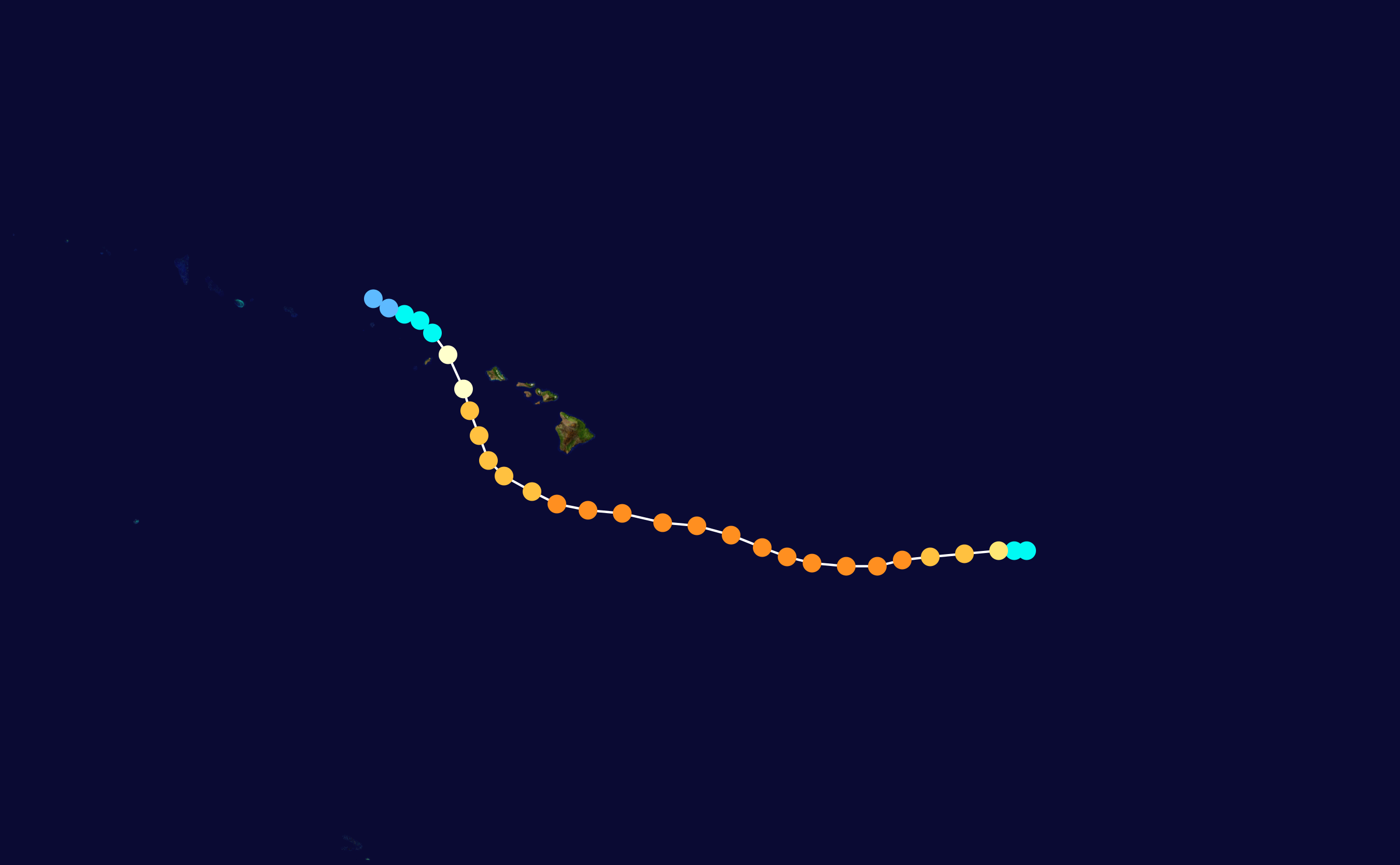
- Duration: August 1 – August 8
- Peak intensity: 150 mph (240 km/h) (1-min); 952 mbar (hPa)

Dot was first identified as a strong tropical storm southeast of Hawaiʻi on August 1. The storm was potentially a continuation of a previously unnamed tropical cyclone that was monitored west of the Baja California Peninsula from July 24-27, but was never confirmed due to a lack of ship reports. Dot was quick to intensify, reaching hurricane intensity six hours after naming. By August 3, Dot reached its peak intensity, with maximum sustained winds reaching 150 mph (240 km/h). Intensity leveled off afterwards as Dot tracked westward before making a curve towards the northwest on August 5, after which the hurricane weakened at a faster clip. Dot made landfall the next day on Kauai as a minimal hurricane before dissipating west of the Hawaiian Islands on August 8.

Dot produced heavy rainfall and gusty winds as it passed south of the Big Island, Lanai, Maui, Molokai, and Oahu, resulting in minor damage. In Oahu, some homes along the coast were unroofed, and damage from wave action was also reported. Damage from these four islands totaled US$150,000, and two indirect deaths occurred in Lanai. Extensive damage occurred on Kauai as Dot made landfall, producing wind gusts as high as 103 mph (166 km/h) and toppling trees and power lines. Widespread power outages affected the island, causing telecommunications and water systems to fail. Although infrastructure was damaged to an extent by floodwater and strong winds, crops suffered the most losses. Cane sugar crops sustained US$2.7 million in losses. Overall, damage from Dot across Hawaii totaled US$6 million, and a disaster area declaration and state of emergency took effect for the archipelago after the hurricane's passage.

=== Tropical Storm Seven ===
- Tropical storm (SSHWS)
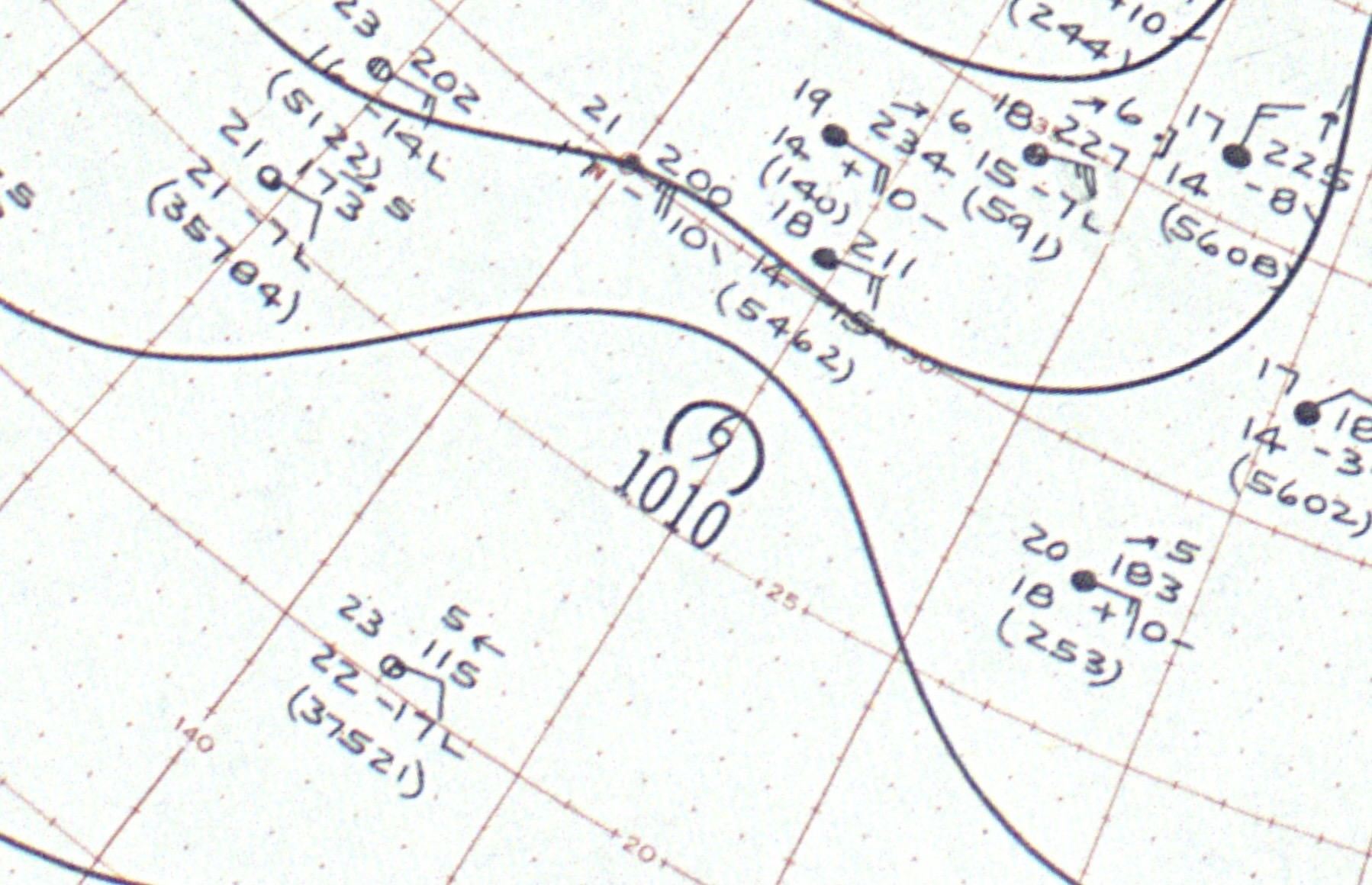
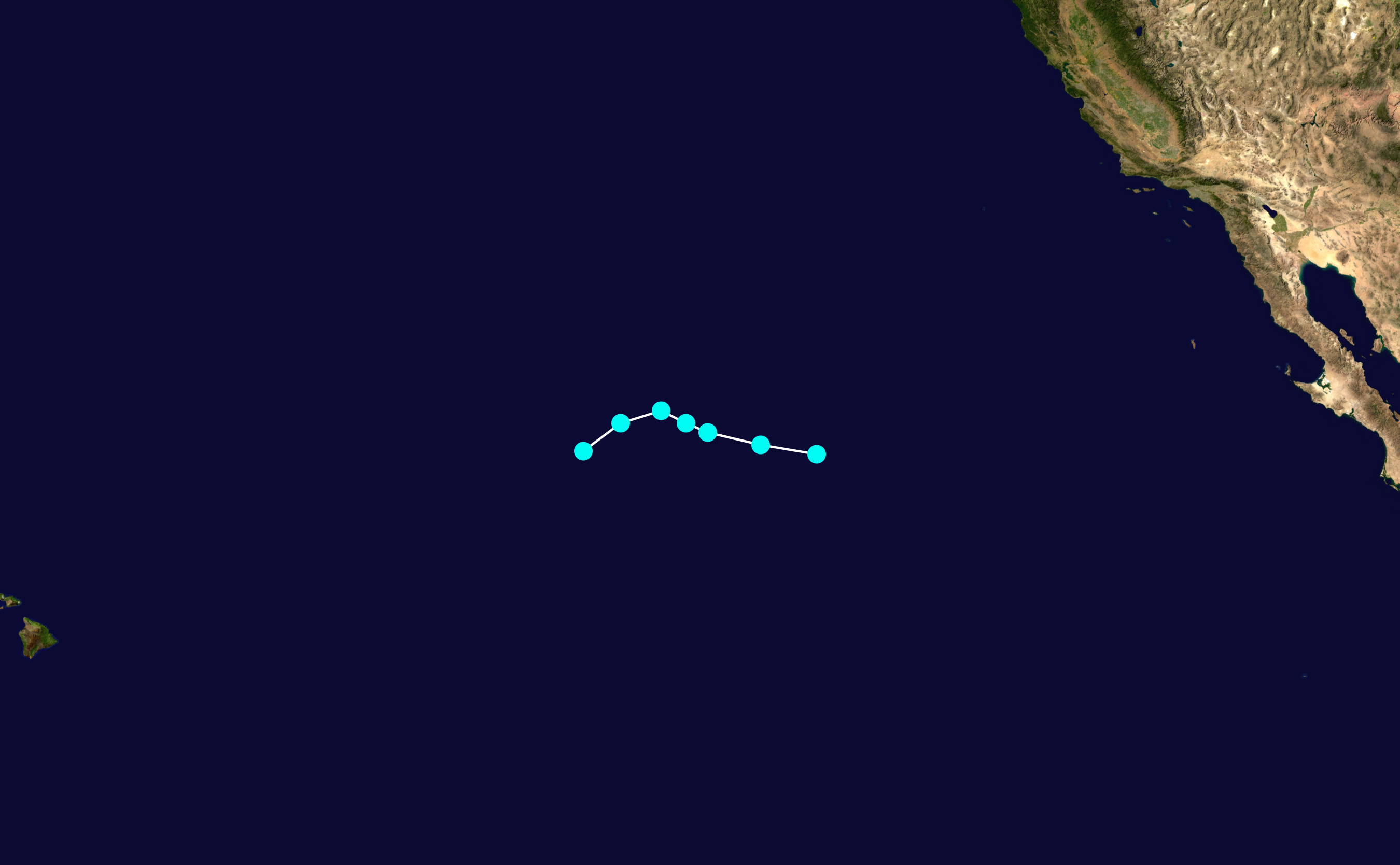
- Duration: August 4 – August 6
- Peak intensity: 45 mph (75 km/h) (1-min); 1010 mbar (hPa)

On August 4, a tropical storm formed at about 26°N, quite a long way north for tropical cyclone formation. This system gradually moved west and then turned to the west-south-west late on August 5. It dissipated a couple of hours later.

=== Tropical Storm Eight ===
- Tropical storm (SSHWS)
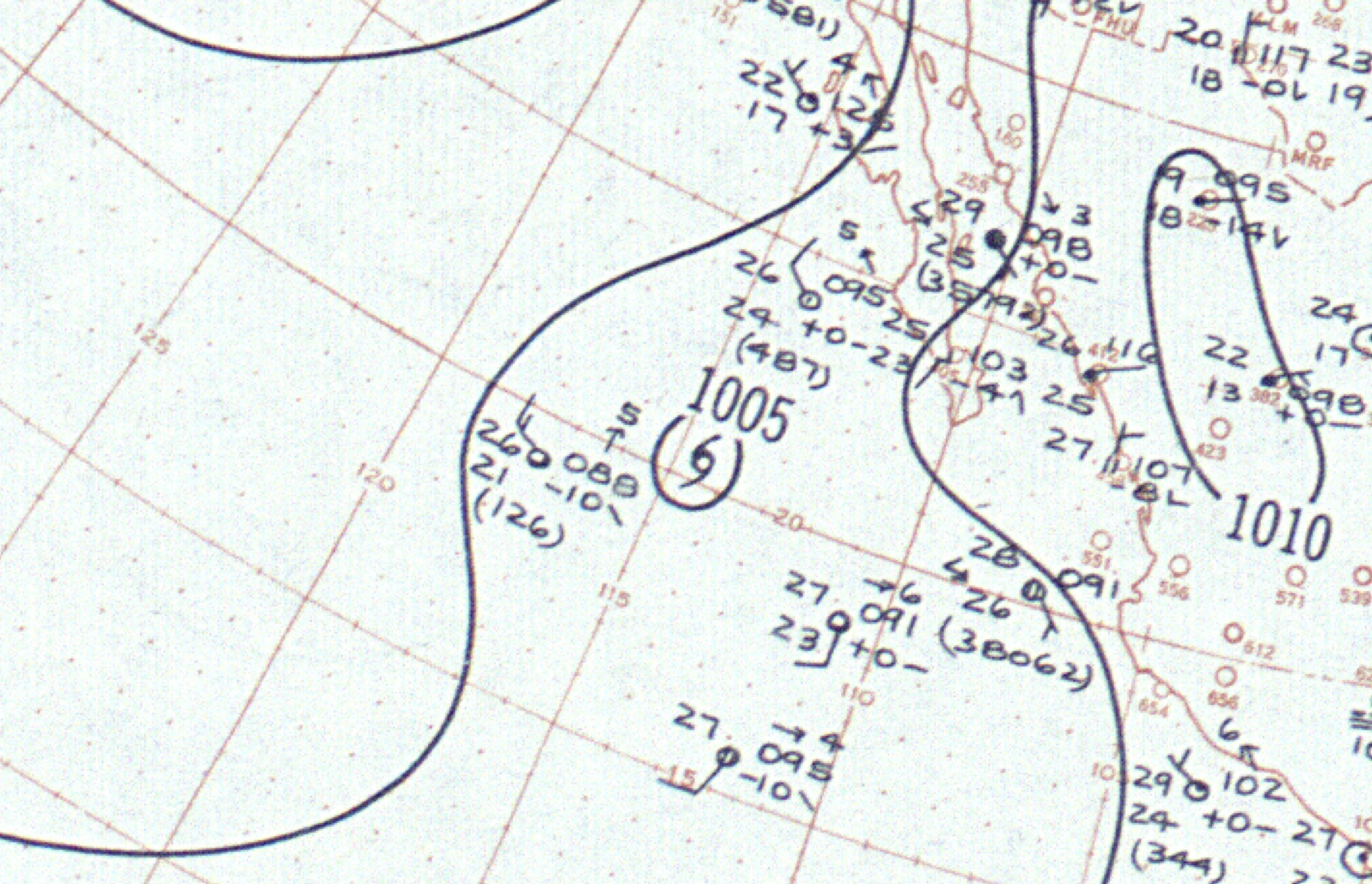
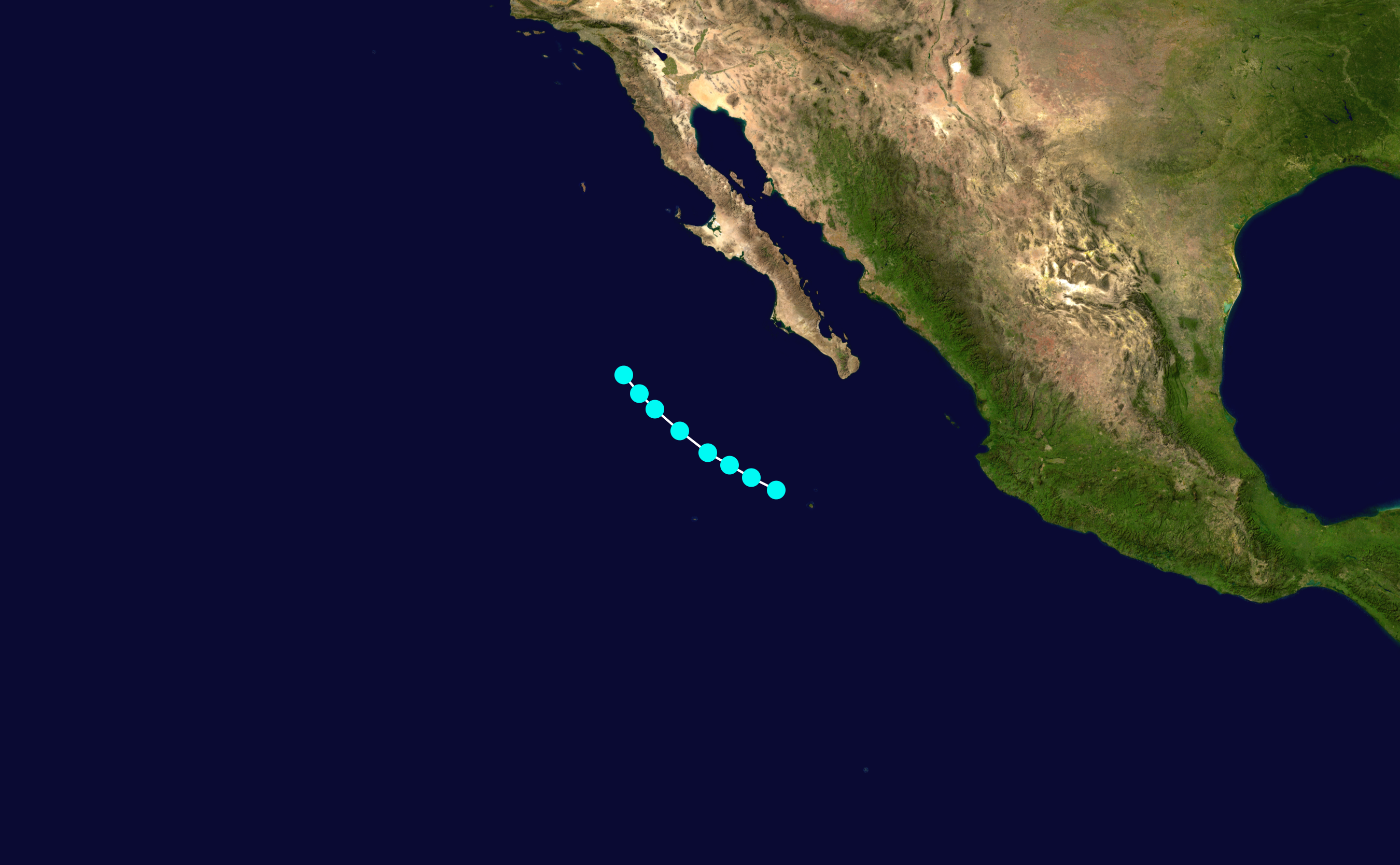
- Duration: August 19 – August 21
- Peak intensity: 45 mph (75 km/h) (1-min); 1007 mbar (hPa)

Tropical Storm Eight formed on August 19, several hundred miles west of Mexico. This system did not affect land so no deaths or damages were contributed to this tropical storm.

=== Tropical Storm Nine ===
- Tropical storm (SSHWS)
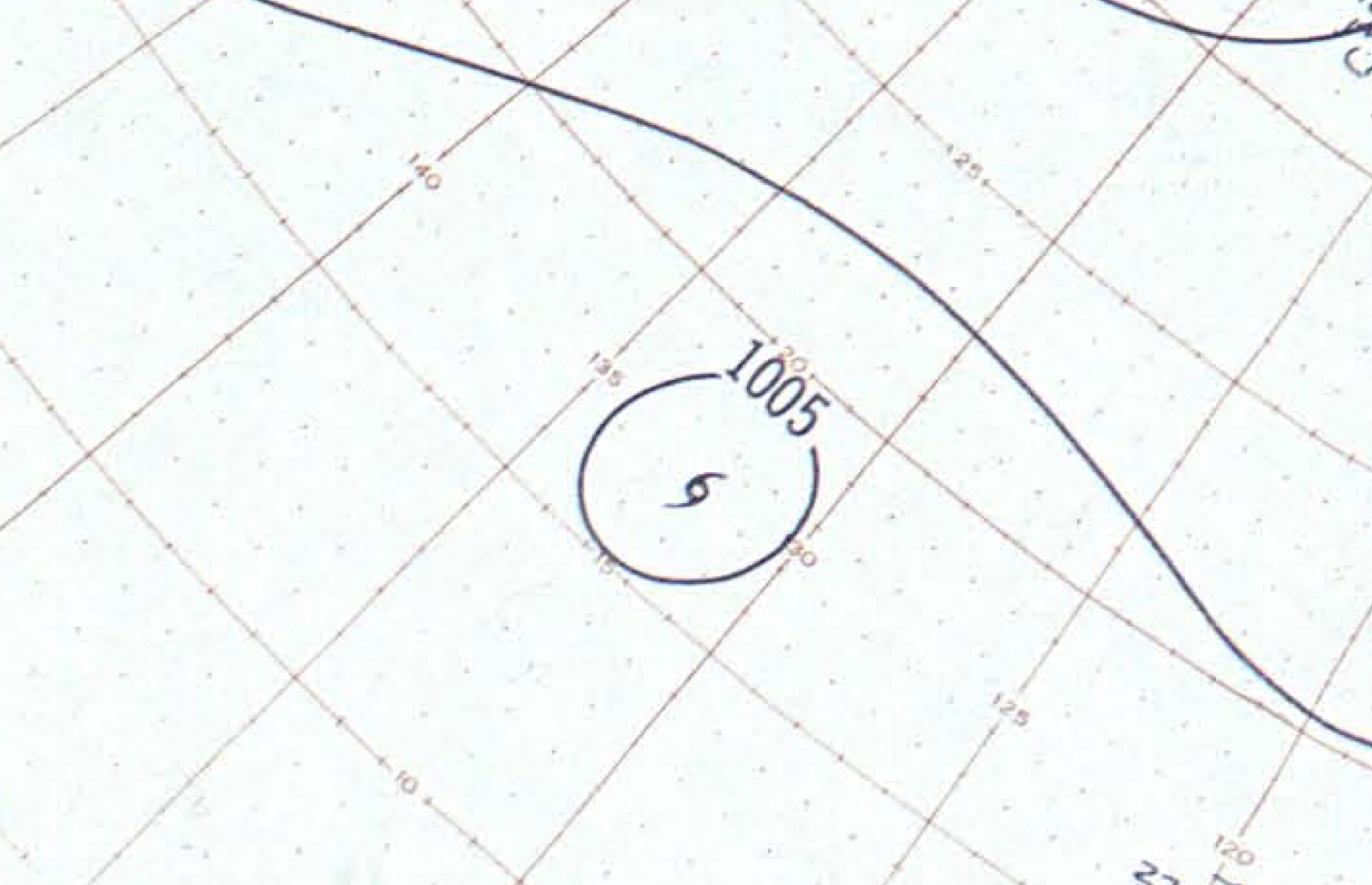
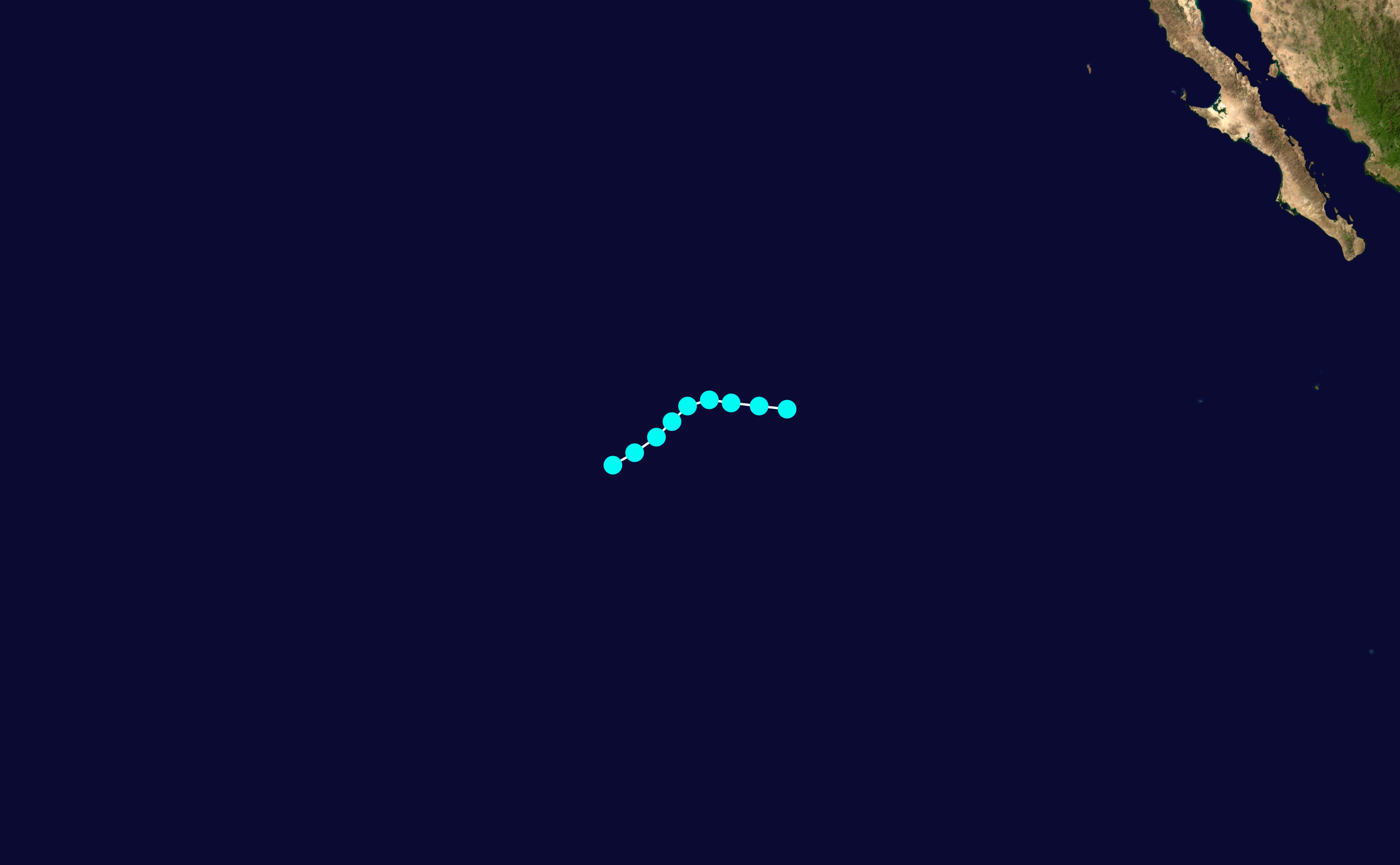
- Duration: August 27 – August 29
- Peak intensity: 45 mph (75 km/h) (1-min); 996 mbar (hPa)

Just days after Tropical Storm Eight dissipated, meteorologists noticed a new tropical system that, once again, was out at sea. Although the storm reached 45 mph winds, it only lasted 2 days.

=== Hurricane Ten ===
- Category 1 hurricane (SSHWS)
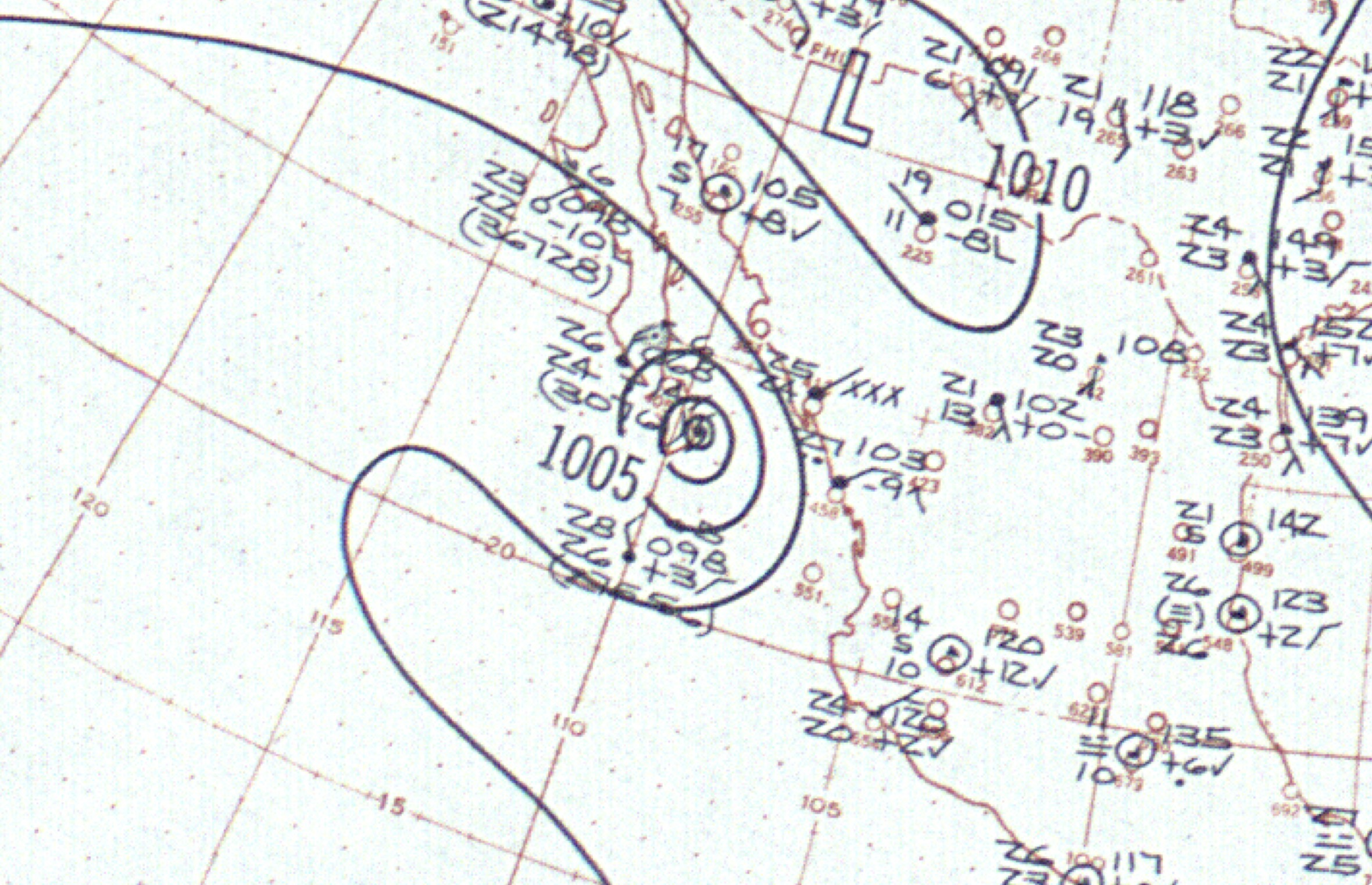
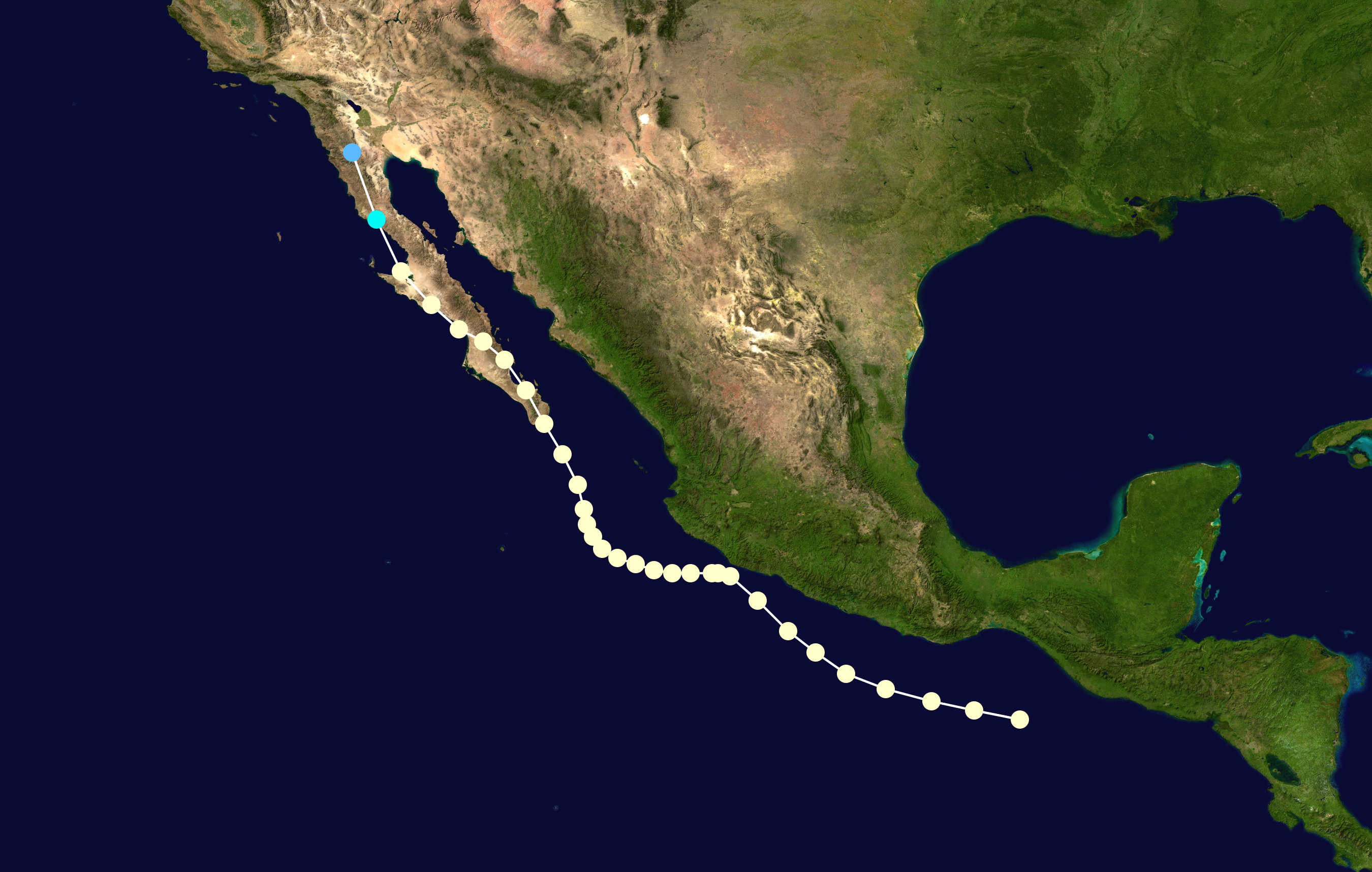
- Duration: September 4 – September 11
- Peak intensity: 85 mph (140 km/h) (1-min); 987 mbar (hPa)

Hurricane Ten formed off the coast of Guatemala as a Category 1 hurricane. It nearly made landfall on September 6. The system turned to the north, then NNW on September 7. It made landfall in Baja California Sur and continued along the state before weakening to a tropical storm, then a tropical depression. It dissipated near the USA-Mexico border.

=== Hurricane Patsy ===
- Category 5 hurricane (SSHWS)
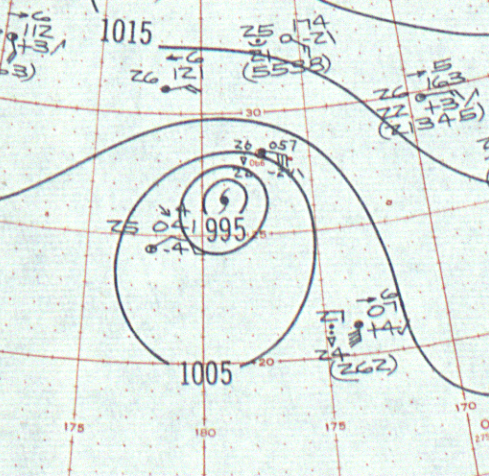
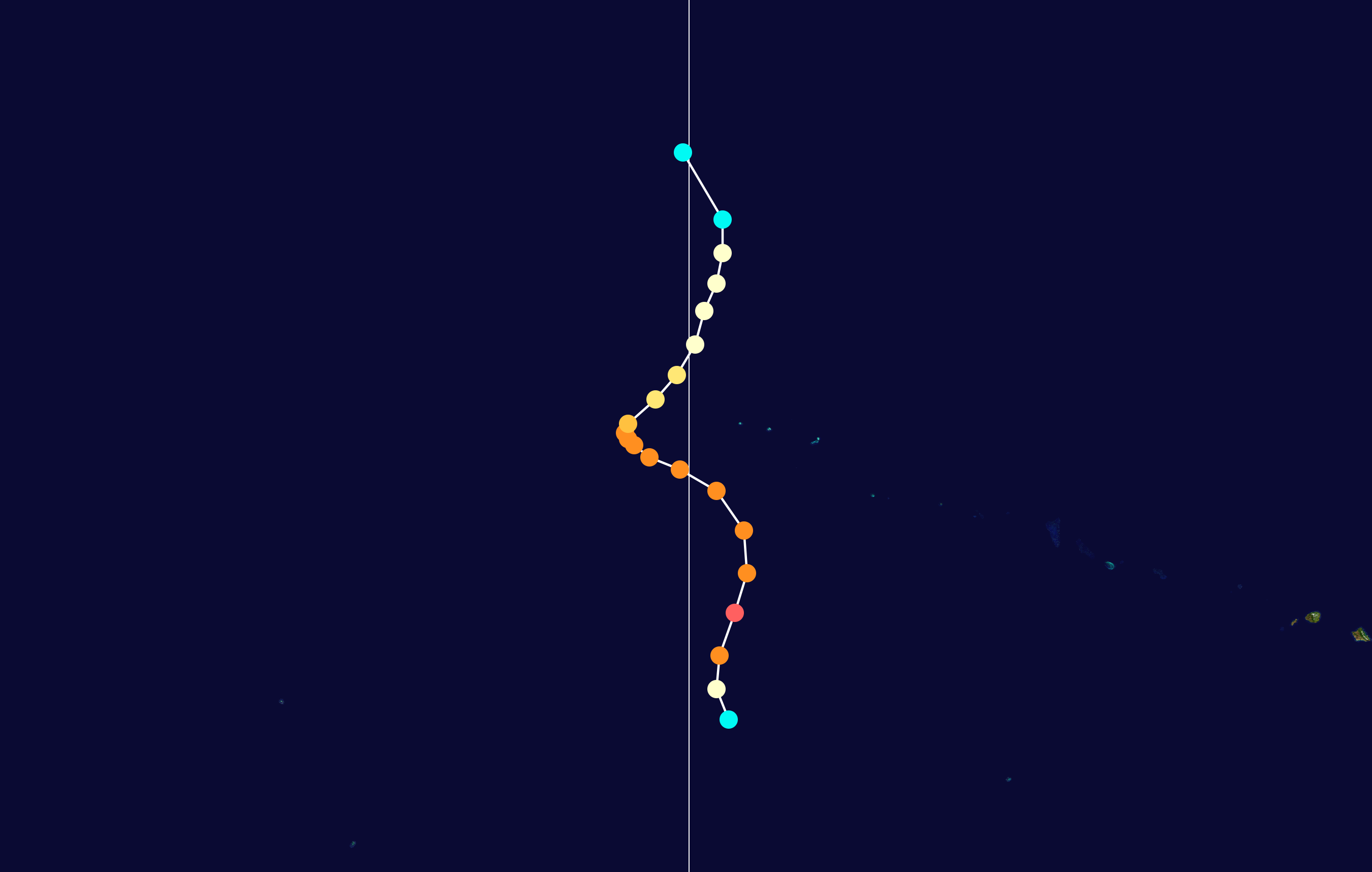
- Duration: September 6 – September 10
- Peak intensity: 175 mph (280 km/h) (1-min); 930 mbar (hPa)

On September 6, reports from aircraft indicated the existence of a hurricane near the International Date Line. Earlier stages were missed because of a lack of data in the isolated area. Six hours after classification, Patsy reached Category 5 strength, with winds of 160 mph, although it is possible Category 5 status was reached before. A trough moved Patsy northeast. The trough then weakened, and allowed Patsy to curve northwest. The Japan Meteorological Agency's best track at this time Patsy crossed the dateline, at Category 4 strength. A second trough then formed, dominated the first, and recurved Patsy northeast, recrossing the dateline, at Category 3 intensity. The storm then quickly weakened due to unfavorable conditions, while slowly curving northwards. From reports, it is estimated Patsy dissipated on September 10, though other reports credit Patsy with having regenerated as a tropical depression on September 13, north of Hawaii. Patsy's track around the International Date Line was unseen and erratic. Typhoon June's track one year prior was somewhat similar to Patsy's.

Patsy is also an uncommon west to east crosser of the dateline, and one of only a few storms known to have crossed the dateline twice. Including only systems recognized by the Central Pacific Hurricane Center, there have been only six other recorded systems that have crossed the dateline from west to east.

The National Hurricane Center's "best track" data set has Patsy exclusively east of the dateline from detection to dissipation. The Japan Meteorological Agency's "best track" does not give wind speeds, only indicating that Patsy was a typhoon. The Joint Typhoon Warning Center's report disagrees on location but also has Patsy's maximum windspeed east of the dateline. Patsy was the first known Pacific hurricane to reach Category 5 intensity on the Saffir–Simpson scale. Also, its maximum reported windspeed of 150 knots (280 km/h) makes it the central Pacific hurricane with the highest sustained winds until Hurricane John tied this record in 1994.

=== Hurricane Twelve ===
- Category 1 hurricane (SSHWS)
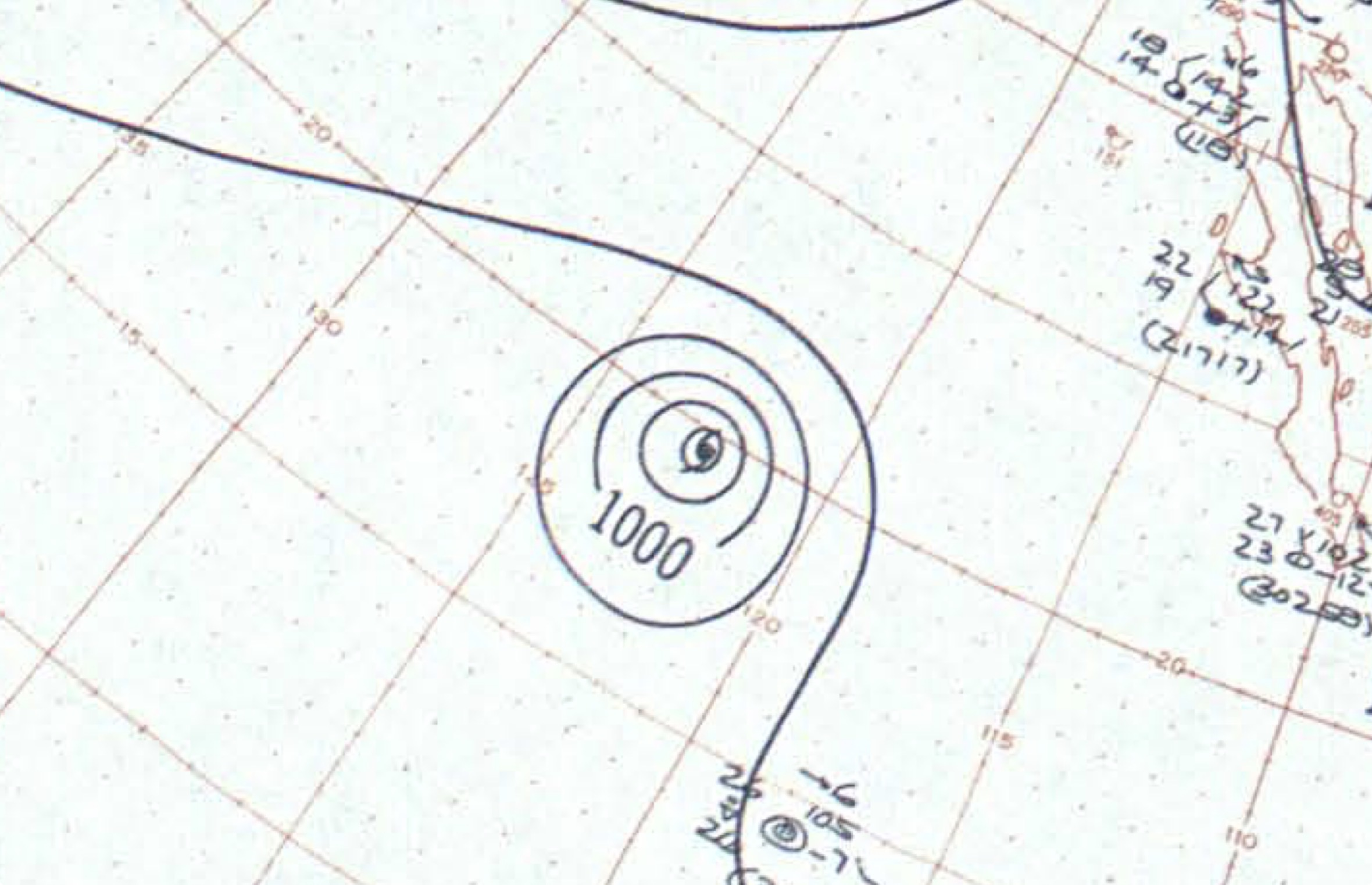
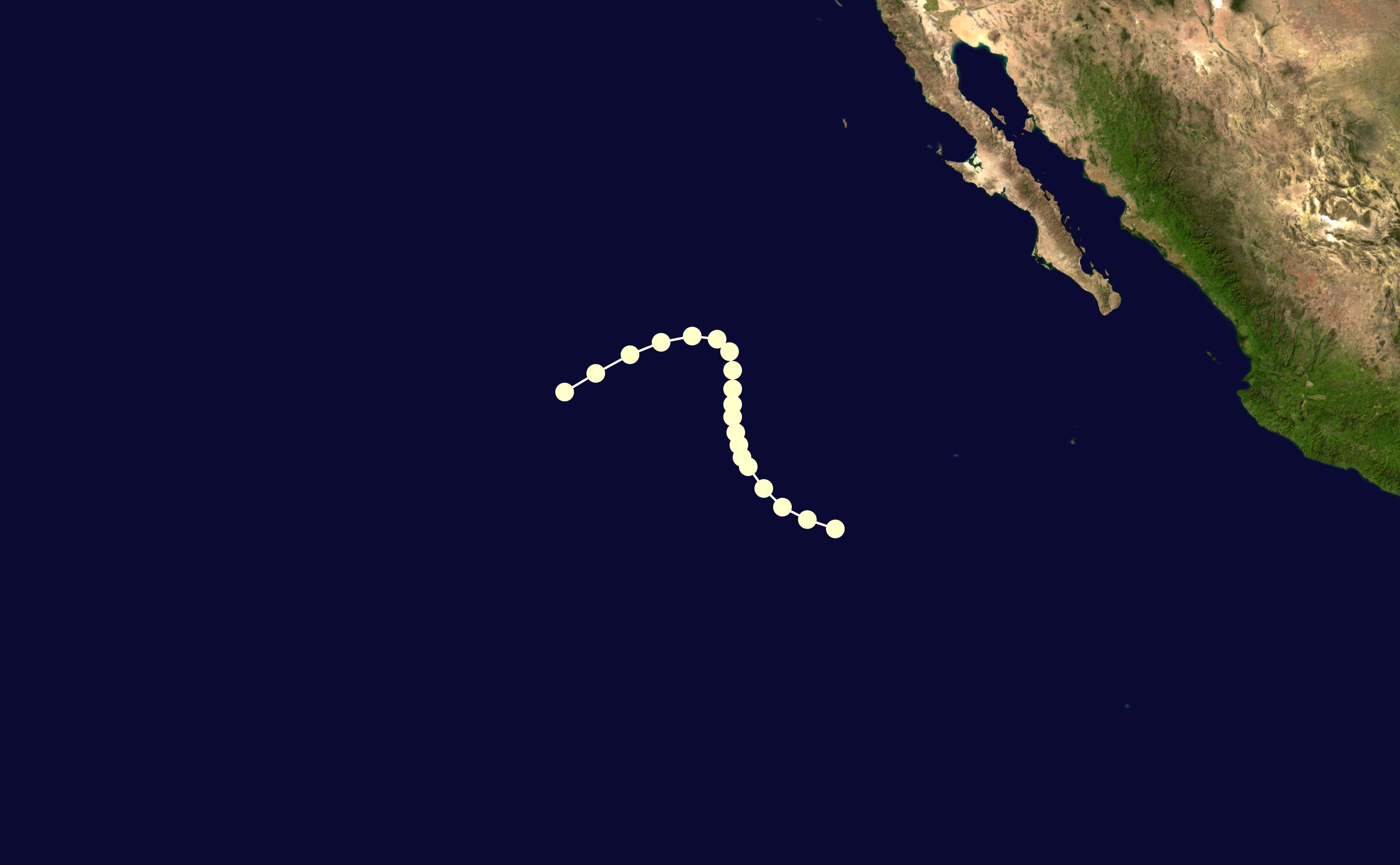
- Duration: September 21 – September 26
- Peak intensity: 85 mph (140 km/h) (1-min); 967 mbar (hPa)

Twelve stayed to sea and was a Category 1 hurricane for its known life.

=== Tropical Storm Wanda ===
- Tropical storm (SSHWS)
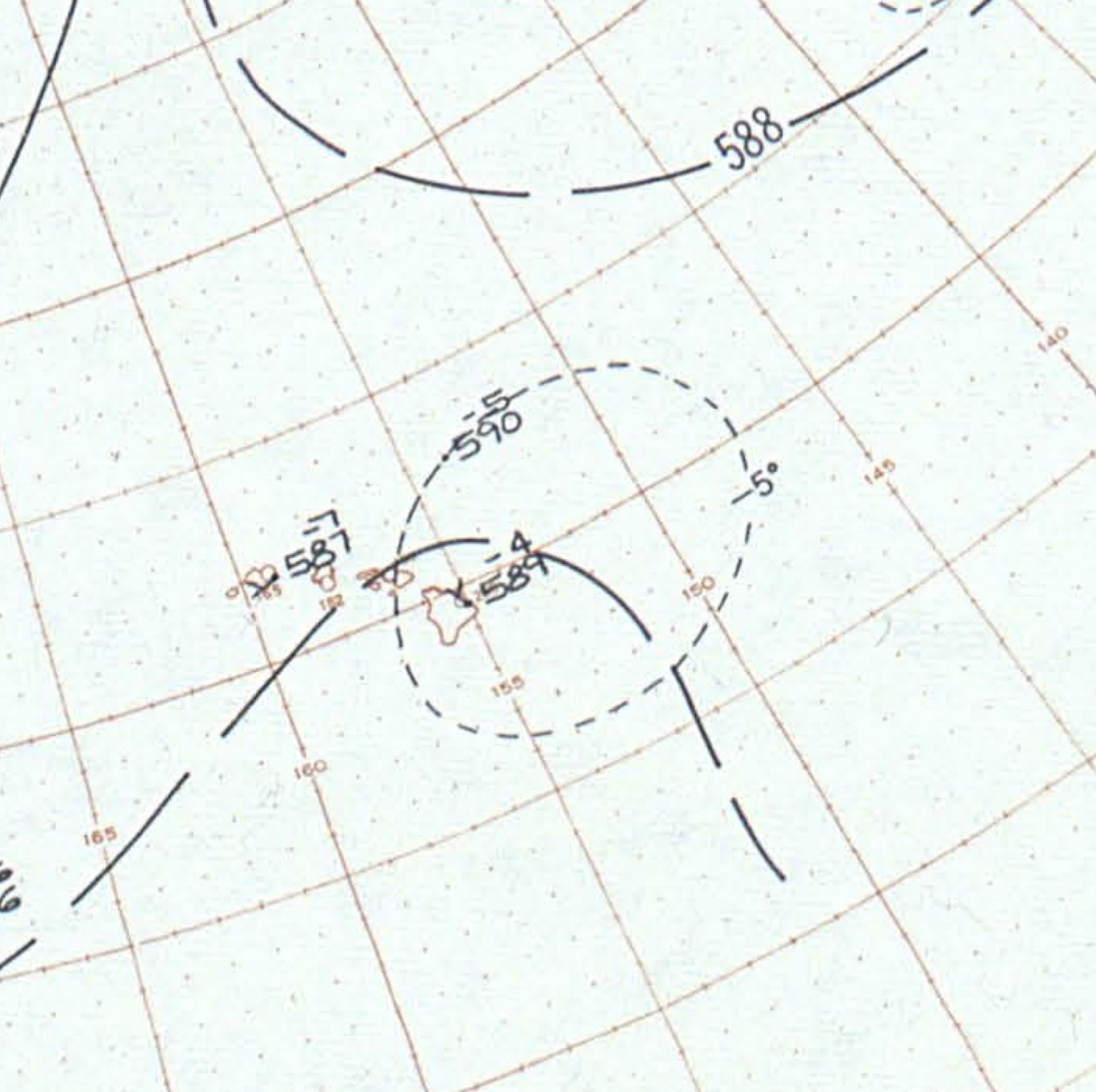
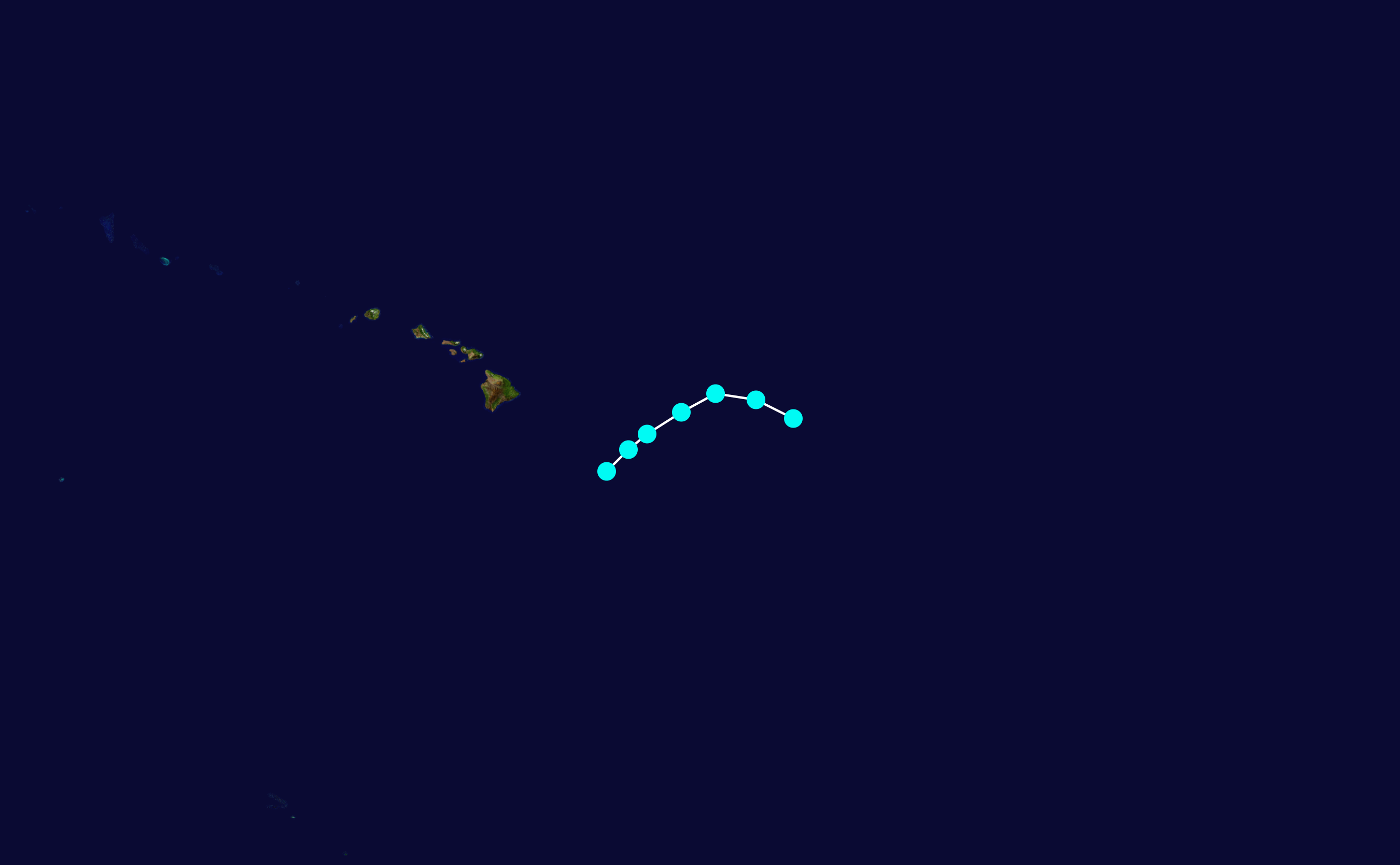
- Duration: September 26 – September 27
- Peak intensity: 70 mph (110 km/h) (1-min);

Tropical Storm Wanda existed from September 26 to September 27. The name Wanda was assigned from the North Pacific Typhoon name list.

=== Tropical Storm Fourteen ===
- Tropical storm (SSHWS)
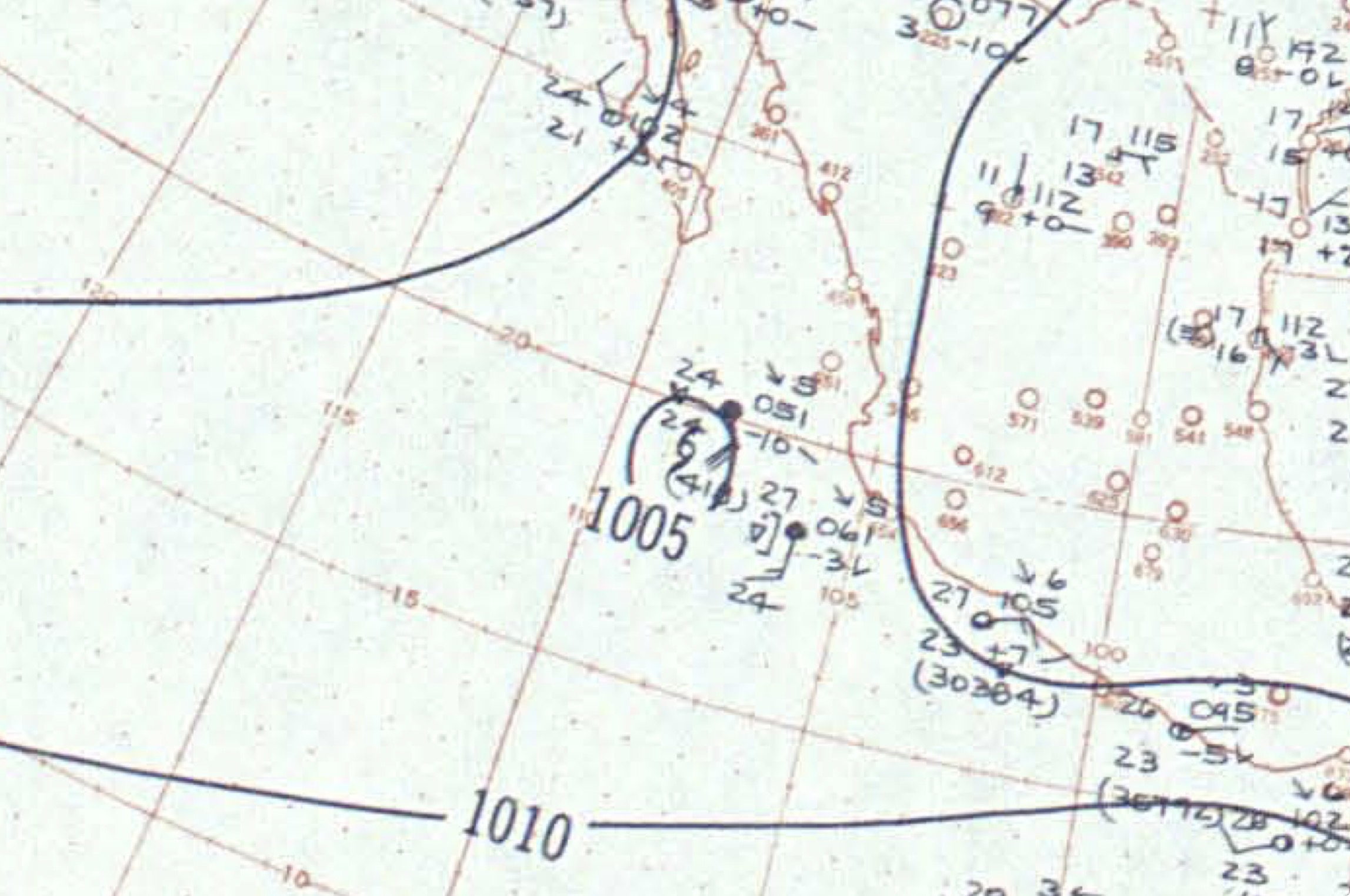
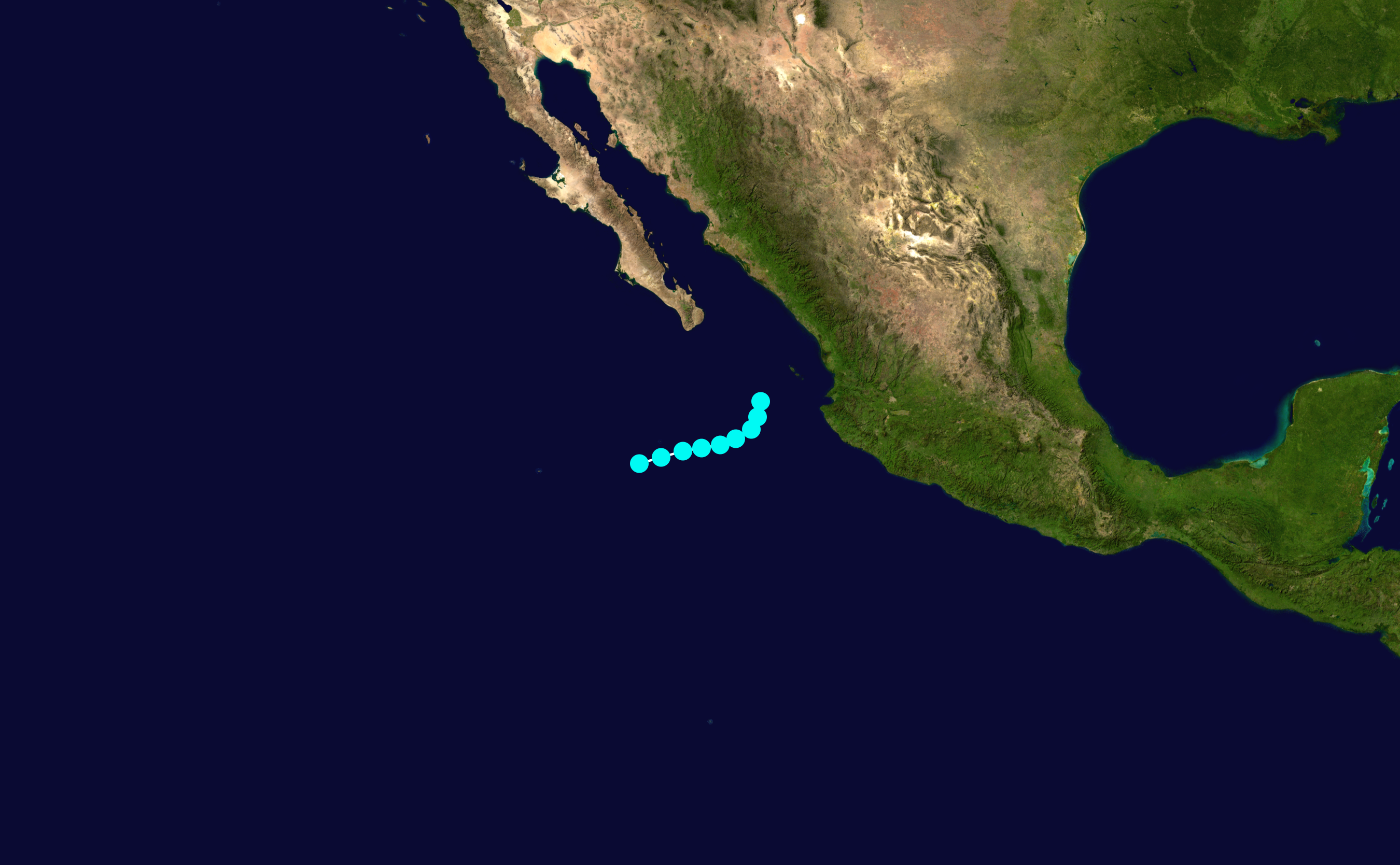
- Duration: October 19 – October 21
- Peak intensity: 50 mph (85 km/h) (1-min); 1003 mbar (hPa)

Tropical Storm Fourteen existed from October 19 to October 21.

=== Hurricane Fifteen ===
- Category 4 hurricane (SSHWS)
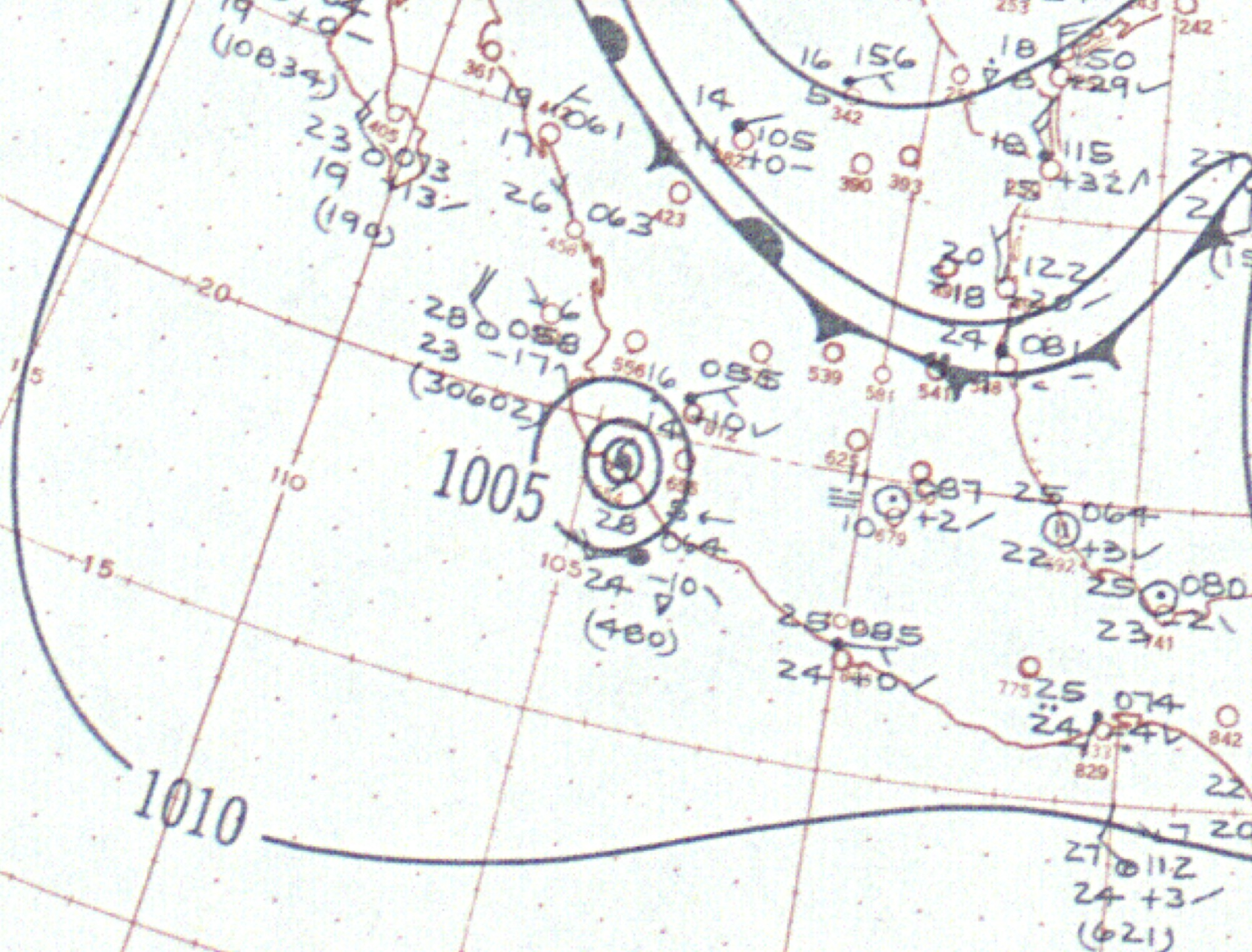
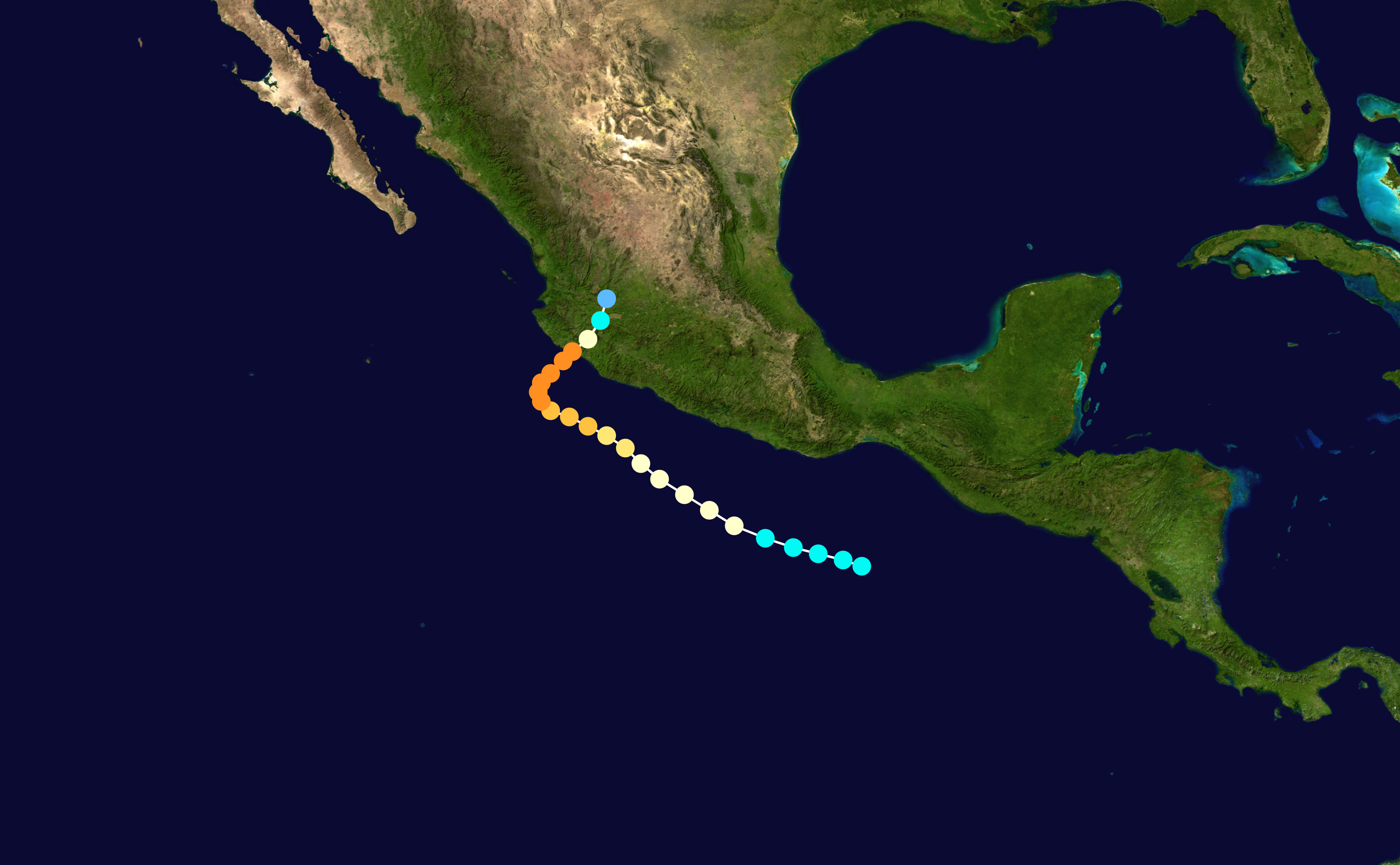
- Duration: October 23 – October 29
- Peak intensity: 140 mph (220 km/h) (1-min); 955 mbar (hPa)

The most notable storm this year was the 1959 Mexico hurricane. It made landfall as a Category 4 on October 27 and killed at least 1800 people, making it the deadliest Pacific hurricane on record.

== See also ==
- Pacific hurricane season
- List of Pacific hurricanes
- 1959 Atlantic hurricane season
- 1959 Pacific typhoon season
- 1959 North Indian Ocean cyclone season
- Australian region cyclone seasons: 1959–60 1960–61
- South Pacific cyclone seasons: 1959–60 1960–61
- South-West Indian Ocean cyclone seasons: 1959–60 1960–61
