= Simple Ocean Data Assimilation =

Oceanic reanalysis data set consisting of gridded state variables for the global ocean

The Simple Ocean Data Assimilation (SODA) analysis is an oceanic reanalysis data set consisting of gridded state variables for the global ocean, as well as several derived fields. SODA was developed in the 1990s as a collaborative project between the Department of Atmospheric and Oceanic Science at the University of Maryland and the Department of Oceanography at Texas A&M University with the goal of providing an improved estimate of ocean state from those based solely on observations or numerical simulations. Since its first release there have been several updates, the most recent of which extends from 1958 to 2008, as well as a “beta release” of a long-term reanalysis for 1871–2008.

== Initial release ==
Initially released in 2000, SODA included data from the 1994 World Ocean Atlas (WOA-94) such as MBT, XBT, CTD and station data; hydrography, SST, and altimeter measured sea level; as well as data from NODC, NCEP, and TOGA-TAO. The spatial extent of the first release was more limited than subsequent releases, extending from 62°S to 62°N, and covering the time period from January 1950 through December 1995.

== Current release ==
The latest release of SODA (SODA 2.1.6) covers the time period from January 1958 to December 2008. As part of the data assimilation scheme, the system ingests a wide variety of observations including hydrographic profiles, ocean station data, moored temperature and salinity measurements, surface temperature and salinity observations from a variety of instruments (e.g., MBT, XBT, CTD), sea surface temperature (SST) from nighttime infrared observations from satellites, and satellite based sea level altimetry. Additionally, the numerical model used for forecasts is driven by surface winds from the European Center for Medium-Range Weather Forecasts ERA-40 reanalysis data set during the period between 1958 and 2001, and from the QuickSCAT scatterometer for 2002–2008. The state variable forecasts used in the assimilation are calculated using a general circulation model based on Parallel Ocean Program numerics with an average horizontal resolution of 0.25°x0.4°, and 40 vertical layers, which have 10-meter vertical resolution near the surface. Starting with version 1.4.2, the ocean model is run using a displaced pole grid configuration, allowing for the representation of Arctic Ocean processes. The data assimilation method used is based on a sequential analysis with a 10-day update cycle.

The reanalysis data is packaged into monthly means from January 1958 to December 2008 (although five-day means are also available) and stored in NetCDF format. Standard state variables were calculated including temperature, salinity, zonal and meridional velocities, and sea level, as well as several derived fields such as heat content. Finalized data was remapped from the displaced pole grid to a uniform horizontal grid with 0.5°x0.5° horizontal resolution and 40 vertical layers with 10-meter vertical resolution near the surface.

In addition to the 61-year reanalysis data set, a “beta” version (i.e., currently being evaluated), SODA 2.2.4, was released in 2010 and extends from 1871 to 2008 with monthly temporal resolution. This extended analysis is identical in horizontal and vertical spatial resolution as the standard reanalysis data set (SODA 2.1.6), and includes similar output variables.

== See also ==
- NECP/NCAR reanalysis
- ECMWF reanalysis
- Ocean reanalysis
- Meteorological reanalysis
