= Reanalysis =

Reanalysis is a new analysis of something. It may refer to:

- Reanalysis (linguistics) or folk etymology, change in a word or phrase resulting from the replacement of an unfamiliar form by a more familiar one
  - Rebracketing, a process where a word originally derived from one source is broken down into a different set of factors
  - Back-formation, a process of creating a new word by removing actual or supposed affixes
- New statistical analysis of a data set that has already been analyzed
- A repeat analysis, for example in chemistry

== See also ==
- The dictionary definition of reanalysis at Wiktionary
- Meteorological reanalysis, a project to analyze historical meteorological data
- Ocean reanalysis, a method of combining historical ocean observations with a general ocean model
