= ECMWF re-analysis =

Data set for retrospective weather analysis

The ECMWF reanalysis project is a meteorological reanalysis project carried out by the European Centre for Medium-Range Weather Forecasts (ECMWF), integrating historical meteorological observations onto a regularly spaced global grid for retrospective weather data analysis. It spans data from 1940 to the present.

== Generation ==
The data were produced through many sources of meteorological observations, including radiosondes, balloons, aircraft, buoys, satellites, scatterometers. This data was run through the ECMWF computer model.

As the ECMWF's computer model is one of the more highly regarded in the field of forecasting, many scientists take its reanalysis to have similar merit. The data is stored in GRIB format. The reanalysis was done in an effort to improve the accuracy of historical weather maps and aid in a more detailed analysis of various weather systems through a period that was severely lacking in computerized data. With the data from reanalyses such as this, many of the more modern computerized tools for analyzing storm systems can be utilized, at least in part, because of this access to a computerized simulation of the atmospheric state.

== History ==
The first reanalysis product, ERA-15, generated reanalyses for approximately 15 years, from December 1978 to February 1994. The second product, ERA-40 (originally intended as a 40-year reanalysis) begins in 1957 (the International Geophysical Year) and covers 45 years to 2002 at a resolution of 125 km. As a precursor to a revised extended reanalysis product to replace ERA-40, ECMWF released ERA-Interim, which covers the period from 1979 to 2019.

The reanalysis product ERA5, released by ECMWF as part of the Copernicus Climate Change Service, features a spatial resolution of 31 km and currently spans from 1940 to the present. It has since become one of the most widely used global historical weather datasets in scientific research.

As of 2024 a new update, ERA6, has been in development with ~14 km horizontal resolution, and is planned for staged release beginning with the most recent 20 years by late 2026.

In addition to reanalysing all the old data using a consistent system, the reanalyses also make use of much archived data that was not available to the original analyses. This allows for the correction of many historical hand-drawn maps where the estimation of features was common in areas of data sparsity. The ability is also present to create new maps of atmosphere levels that were not commonly used until more recent times.

== Accessing the data ==
The ECMWF re-analysis products are accessible from the Climate Change Services homepage. The data can be downloaded for research use from ECMWF's homepage (see external links) and the National Center for Atmospheric Research data archives. Both require registration. A Python web API can be used to download a subset of parameters for a selected region and time period.

== See also ==
- NCEP/NCAR reanalysis
