= Atmospheric reanalysis =

Scientific procedure for the creation of meteorological data sets

An atmospheric reanalysis (also: meteorological reanalysis and climate reanalysis) is a meteorological and climate data assimilation project which aims to assimilate historical atmospheric observational data spanning an extended period, using a single consistent assimilation (or "analysis") scheme throughout.

== Operational data analysis ==
In operational numerical weather prediction, forecast models are used to predict future states of the atmosphere, based on how the climate system evolves with time from an initial state. The initial state provided as input to the forecast must consist of data values for a range of "prognostic" meteorological fields – that is, those fields which determine the future evolution of the model. Spatially varying fields are required in the form used by the model, for example at each intersection point on a regular grid of longitude and latitude circles, and initial data must be valid at a single time that corresponds to the present or the recent past. By contrast, the available observational data usually do not include all of the model's prognostic fields, and may include other additional fields; these data also have different spatial distribution from the forecast model grid, are valid over a range of times rather than a single time, and are also subject to observational error. The technique of data assimilation is therefore used to produce an analysis of the initial state, which is a best fit of the numerical model to the available data, taking into account the errors in the model and the data.

== Uses ==
In addition to initializing operational forecasts, the analyses themselves are a valuable tool for subsequent meteorological and climatological studies. However, an operational analysis dataset, i.e. the analysis data which were used for the real-time forecasts, will typically suffer from inconsistency if it spans any extended period of time, because operational analysis systems are frequently being improved. A reanalysis project involves reprocessing observational data spanning an extended historical period using a consistent modern analysis system, to produce a dataset that can be used for meteorological and climatological studies.

Diverse studies use reanalysis data for reproducing other climatic variables by black-box models (e.g. sea state variables).

== Examples ==
Examples of reanalysis datasets include the ECMWF re-analysis, the Modern-Era Retrospective analysis for Research and Applications, Version 2 (MERRA-2), and the NCEP/NCAR Reanalysis, and the JRA-25 reanalysis conducted by the Japan Meteorological Agency. In addition to these global reanalysis projects, there are also high-resolution regional reanalysis activities for different regions, e.g. for North America, Europe or Australia. Such regional reanalyses are typically based on a regional weather forecasting model and use boundary conditions from a global reanalysis.

=== ECMWF re-analysis ===
The ECMWF reanalysis project is a meteorological reanalysis project carried out by the European Centre for Medium-Range Weather Forecasts (ECMWF), integrating historical meteorological observations onto a regularly spaced global grid for retrospective weather data analysis.

The first reanalysis product, ERA-15, generated reanalyses for approximately 15 years, from December 1978 to February 1994. The second product, ERA-40 (originally intended as a 40-year reanalysis) begins in 1957 (the International Geophysical Year) and covers 45 years to 2002 at a resolution of 125 km. As a precursor to a revised extended reanalysis product to replace ERA-40, ECMWF released ERA-Interim, which covers the period from 1979 to 2019. The reanalysis product ERA5, released by ECMWF as part of the Copernicus Climate Change Service, features a spatial resolution of 31 km and currently spans from 1940 to the present. It has since become one of the most widely used global historical weather datasets in scientific research.

A new update, ERA6, is in development with ~14 km horizontal resolution, and is planned for staged release beginning with the most recent 20 years by late 2026.

In addition to reanalysing all the old data using a consistent system, the reanalyses also make use of much archived data that was not available to the original analyses. This allows for the correction of many historical hand-drawn maps where the estimation of features was common in areas of data sparsity. The ability is also present to create new maps of atmosphere levels that were not commonly used until more recent times.

=== NCEP/NCAR Reanalysis ===
The NCEP/NCAR Reanalysis is an atmospheric reanalysis produced by the National Centers for Environmental Prediction (NCEP) and the National Center for Atmospheric Research (NCAR). It is a continually updated globally gridded data set that represents the state of the Earth's atmosphere, incorporating observations and numerical weather prediction (NWP) model output from 1948 to present.

== Caution in usage ==
While often reanalysis can be thought as the best estimate on many variables (such as winds and temperature) of the atmosphere, its usage must be taken with caution. Degradation, replacement, or modification of instruments (e.g. satellites), as well as changes in methods of observation (e.g., surface, aloft) may create error. Not all reanalysis data are constrained by observation: some data types, such as precipitation (depending on the reanalysis) and surface evapotranspiration (for which global observations simply do not exist), are obtained by running (presumably newer) general circulation or NWP models. Reanalyses are known not to conserve moisture.

== Reading about specific reanalyses ==
- Kalnay, E., and coauthors, 1996: The NCEP/NCAR 40-Year Reanalysis Project. Bull. Amer. Meteor. Soc., 77, 437–471.
- Kanamitsu, M., W. Ebisuzaki, J. Woolen, S.-K. Yang, J. J. Hnilo, M. Fiorino, and G. L. Potter, 2002: NCEP-DOE AMIP-II Reanalysis (R-2). Bull. Amer. Meteor. Soc., 83, 1631–1643.
- Mesinger, F., and coauthors, 2006: North American Regional Reanalysis. Bull. Amer. Meteor. Soc., 87, 343–360, http://dx.doi.org/10.1175/BAMS-87-3-343.
- Uppala, S., and coauthors, 2005: The ERA-40 Re-Analysis. Quart. J. Roy. Meteor. Soc., 131, 2961–3012, https://doi.org/10.1256/qj.04.176.
- Hersbach, H., Bell, B., Berrisford, P., Hirahara, S., Horányi, A., Muñoz-Sabater, J., Nicolas, J., Peubey, C., Radu, R., Schepers, D., Simmons, A., Soci, C., Abdalla, S., Abellan, X., Balsamo, G., Bechtold, P., Biavati, G., Bidlot, J., Bonavita, M., De Chiara, G., Dahlgren, P., Dee, D., Diamantakis, M., Dragani, R., Flemming, J., Forbes, R., Fuentes, M., Geer, A., Haimberger, L., Healy, S., Hogan, R. J., Hólm, E. A., Janisková, M., Keeley, S., Laloyaux, P., Lopez, P., Radnoti, G., Rosnay, P. D., Rozum, I., Vamborg, F., Villaume, S., Thépaut, J.-N., 2020: The ERA5 global reanalysis. Q J R Meteorol Soc, https://doi.org/10.1002/qj.3803.
- Onogi, K., and coauthors, 2007: The JRA-25 Reanalysis. J. Meteor. Soc. Japan, 85, 369–432, https://doi.org/10.2151/jmsj.85.369.
- Kaspar, F., Niermann, D., Borsche, M., Fiedler, S., Keller, J., Potthast, R., Rösch, T., Spangehl, T., and Tinz, B., 2020: Regional atmospheric reanalysis activities at Deutscher Wetterdienst: review of evaluation results and application examples with a focus on renewable energy, Adv. Sci. Res., 17, 115–128, https://doi.org/10.5194/asr-17-115-2020.
- Khatibi, A.; Krauter, S. Validation and Performance of Satellite Meteorological Dataset MERRA-2 for Solar and Wind Applications. Energies 2021, 14, 882. https://doi.org/10.3390/en14040882

== See also ==
- Ocean reanalysis
