= NCEP/NCAR Reanalysis =

Open data set of the Earth's atmosphere

The NCEP/NCAR Reanalysis is an atmospheric reanalysis produced by the National Centers for Environmental Prediction (NCEP) in College Park, Maryland and the National Center for Atmospheric Research (NCAR) in Boulder, Colorado. It is a continually updated globally gridded data set that represents the state of the Earth's atmosphere, incorporating observations and numerical weather prediction (NWP) model output from 1948 to present.

== Accessing the data ==
The data is available for free download from the NOAA Earth System Research Laboratories and National Centers for Environmental Prediction (NCEP). It is distributed in Netcdf and GRIB files, for which a number of tools and libraries exist. It is available for download through the NCAR CISL Research Data Archive on the NCEP/NCAR Reanalysis main data page.

== Uses ==
- Initializing a smaller scale atmospheric model
- Climate assessment
- North American Freezing Level Tracker

== Subsequent updates ==
Since the original NCEP/NCAR Reanalysis, a NCEP-DOE Reanalysis 2 and the NCEP CFS Reanalysis have been released. The former focuses in fixing existing bugs with the NCEP/NCAR Reanalysis system – most notably surface energy and usage of observed precipitation forcing to the land surface, but otherwise uses a similar numerical model and data assimilation system. The latter is based on the NCEP Climate Forecast System.

== See also ==
- ECMWF re-analysis similar tool by the European Centre for Medium-Range Weather Forecasts
