= Tropical Storm Andrea (2013) =

Atlantic Tropical storm in the 2013

- Tropical Storm Andrea at peak intensity, while approaching Florida on June 6

Meteorological history
- Formed: June 5, 2013
- Extratropical: June 7, 2013
- Dissipated: June 10, 2013

Tropical storm
- 1-minute sustained (SSHWS/NWS)
- Highest winds: 65 mph (100 km/h)
- Lowest pressure: 992 mbar (hPa); 29.29 inHg

Overall effects
- Fatalities: 1 direct, 3 indirect
- Damage: $86,000 (2013 USD)
- Areas affected: Yucatán Peninsula, Cuba, United States East Coast, Atlantic Canada
- IBTrACS
- Part of the 2013 Atlantic hurricane season

Tropical Storm Andrea (/ˈændriːʌ/ AN-dree-uh) brought flooding to Cuba, the Yucatan Peninsula, and portions of the East Coast of the United States in June 2013. The first tropical cyclone and named storm of the annual hurricane season, Andrea originated from an area of low pressure in the eastern Gulf of Mexico on June 5. Despite strong wind shear and an abundance of dry air, the storm strengthened while initially heading north-northeastward. Later on June 5, it re-curved northeastward and approached the Big Bend region of Florida. Andrea intensified and peaked as a strong tropical storm with winds at 65 mph (105 km/h) on June 6. A few hours later, the storm weakened slightly and made landfall near Steinhatchee, Florida later that day. It began losing tropical characteristics while tracking across Florida and Georgia. Andrea transitioned into an extratropical cyclone over South Carolina on June 7, though the remnants continued to move along the East Coast of the United States, until being absorbed by another extratropical system offshore Maine on June 10. Andrea was the only tropical system to make landfall in the United States in 2013.

Prior to becoming a tropical cyclone, the precursor to Andrea dropped nearly 12 in (300 mm) of rainfall on the Yucatán Peninsula. In Cuba, the storm brought flooding, especially in Pinar del Río Province. Over 1,000 people fled their homes, mainly along the Cuyaguateje River. A tornado was also spawned in the area, damaging three homes. In Florida, the storm brought heavy rainfall to some areas, causing localized flooding. There were nine tornadoes in Florida, the worst of which touched down in The Acreage and downed power lines and trees, causing significant roof damage to several houses; there was also one injury. After Andrea transition into an extratropical storm, the remnants that also spawned one tornado in North Carolina, though damage was minor. Additionally, minor flooding was reported in some areas of the Northeastern United States. Three fatalities occurred due to weather-related traffic accidents in Virginia and New Jersey. There was a direct death reported after a surfer in South Carolina went missing and was presumed to have drowned. The remnants of Andrea also brought gusty winds to Atlantic Canada, causing thousands of power outages in Nova Scotia and New Brunswick.

== Meteorological history ==
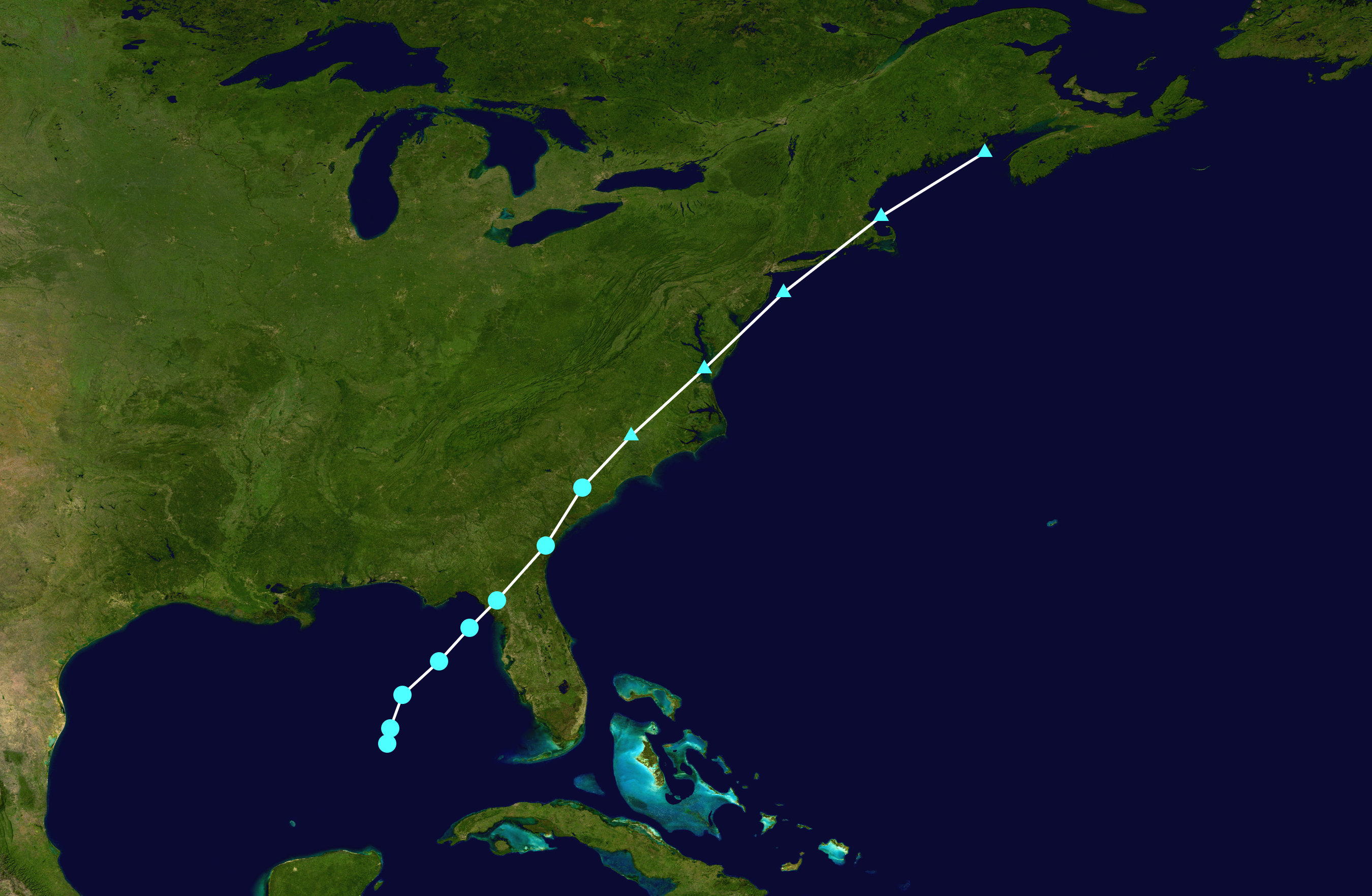
Map plotting the storm's track and intensity, according to the Saffir–Simpson scale Map key Saffir–Simpson scale Tropical depression (≤38 mph, ≤62 km/h) Tropical storm (39–73 mph, 63–118 km/h) Category 1 (74–95 mph, 119–153 km/h) Category 2 (96–110 mph, 154–177 km/h) Category 3 (111–129 mph, 178–208 km/h) Category 4 (130–156 mph, 209–251 km/h) Category 5 (≥157 mph, ≥252 km/h) Unknown Storm type Tropical cyclone Subtropical cyclone Extratropical cyclone, remnant low, tropical disturbance, or monsoon depression

At the end of May 2013, a broad and diffuse cyclonic disturbance developed over eastern Mexico and northern Central America, incorporating the remnants of eastern Pacific Hurricane Barbara. As a tropical wave approached from the east, an inverted trough developed on the northern edge of the active region on June 2, setting the stage for the formation of a weak surface low pressure system over the southern Gulf of Mexico the next day. The National Hurricane Center (NHC) began monitoring the system in their Tropical Weather Outlooks, and bulletins were issued every six hours regarding the probability of tropical cyclone formation within 48 hours. A nearby upper trough created unfavorable conditions for tropical cyclogenesis, subjecting the low to wind shear and abundant dry air that kept it indistinct and disorganized. On June 5, the environment became less hostile, and the system began to improve in structure.

Post-Tropical Cyclone Andrea over The Carolinas on June 7

On June 5, a Hurricane Hunters flight found a closed center and winds of 40 mph (64 km/h). In response, the NHC initiated advisories on Tropical Storm Andrea later that day, while centered about 310 miles (500 km) southwest of St. Petersburg, Florida. Due to somewhat unfavorable conditions, significant strengthening was initially considered unlikely. Early on June 6, deep convection was displaced well to the east and southeast of the center as a result of wind shear up to 29 mph (47 km/h). Despite this, Andrea intensified to attain peak winds of 65 mph (105 km/h) at 1200 UTC that day. Thereafter, unfavorable conditions, including dry air entrainment caused the storm to weaken slightly. At 2200 UTC on June 6, Andrea made landfall in Dixie County, Florida about 10 miles (16 km) south of Steinhatchee. Simultaneously, the storm attained its minimum barometric pressure of 992 mbar (29.3 inHg).

After moving inland on June 6, the NHC noted that extratropical transition was likely within 24 hours and that it "could occur sooner if the convective structure does not improve." By later on June 7, most of the convection became displaced to the northwest due to dry air. Around that time, the storm began accelerating northeastward at 26 mph (42 km/h) due to an approaching mid-latitude trough. Based on ground observations and Doppler weather radar, the system transitioned into an extratropical cyclone at 1800 UTC on June 7, while located over northeastern South Carolina. The remaining thunderstorms around Andrea became indistinguishable from those associated with a frontal zone over North Carolina. Due to a policy created in response to Hurricane Sandy, the NHC continued to issue advisories on the remnants of Andrea as it remained a threat to the East Coast of the United States. On June 8, it moved rapidly northeastward across the Mid-Atlantic and New England. Because gale-force winds were located well to the southeast of the center, the NHC ceased advisories on the remnants of Andrea. Upon reaching the Gulf of Maine, the extratropical remnants of Andrea were absorbed by another extratropical low pressure area around 0000 UTC on June 10.

== Preparations ==
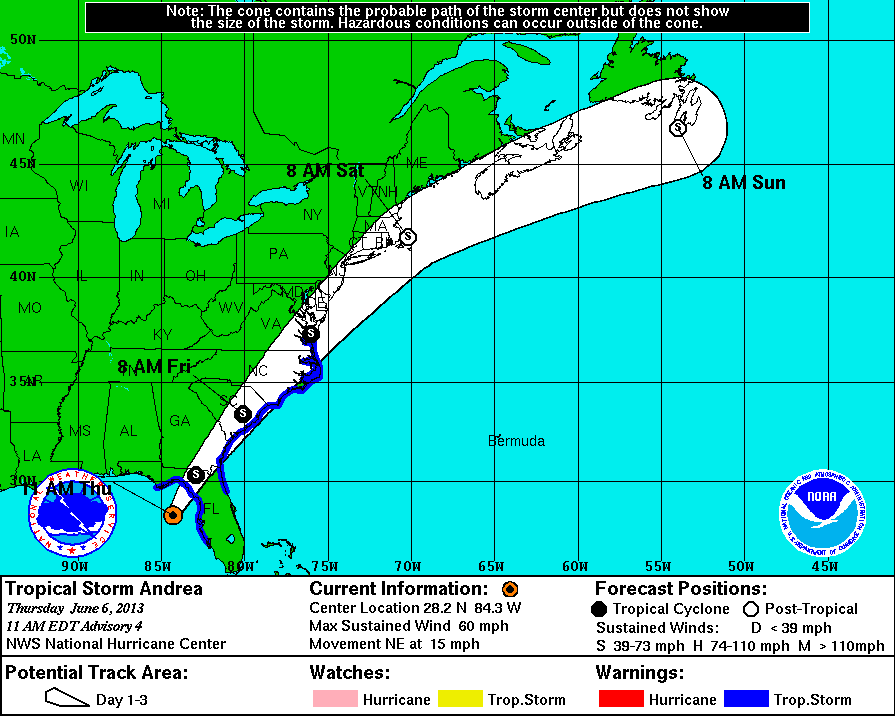
Tropical storm warnings in effect at 1500 UTC on June 6

Multiple tropical cyclone warnings and watches were posted along both the Atlantic and Gulf coasts of the United States in association with Tropical Storm Andrea. At 22:00 UTC on June 5, a tropical storm warning was issued from Boca Grande to the mouth of the Ochlockonee River in Florida. Additionally, a tropical storm watch was put into effect for Flagler Beach, Florida to Surf City, North Carolina. At 0900 UTC on June 6, the tropical storm warning was extended from the mouth of the Ochlockonee River to Indian Pass, Florida. Simultaneously, another tropical storm warning was issued from Flagler Beach, Florida to Cape Charles Light in Virginia. Early on June 7, the tropical storm warning on the Gulf Coast of Florida was expanded to include Boca Grande to the Steinhatchee River in Florida, before being canceled a few hours later. At 0900 UTC on June 7, the tropical storm warning from Flagler Beach to Surf City was modified to Altamaha River, Georgia to Cape Charles Light. Throughout that day, the tropical storm warning was progressively retracted northward, with the southern terminal being at the Savannah River in Georgia at 12:00 UTC, the Santee River in South Carolina at 15:00 UTC, the Little River Inlet in South Carolina at 18:00 UTC, and finally Surf City at 21:00 UTC. Early on June 8, all tropical cyclone warnings and watches were discontinued.

The United States Coast Guard urged marine interests and boaters in Florida, Georgia, and South Carolina to take precaution to protect their lives and vessels. In Florida, the Gulf Islands National Seashore closed their campground and a beach front road. Additionally, several states parks were closed and campers were evacuated. At Pensacola Beach, condominium associations asked residents to remove furniture from high balconies due to the anticipation of strong winds. A state of emergency was issued for Taylor County, where two shelters were opened.

== Impact ==
Becoming a tropical storm on June 5, Andrea marked the fourth consecutive season with a named storm in the month of June, following Hurricane Alex in 2010, Tropical Storm Arlene in 2011, Hurricane Chris, and Tropical Storm Debby in 2012. This was over a month earlier than the 1966–2009 average date of the first named storm, July 9.

The precursor disturbance to Andrea dropped nearly 12 inches (300 mm) of rain on the Yucatán Peninsula in a 24-hour period. In Cuba, the Civil Defense issued a weather alarm for Pinar del Río Province from June 5 to June 6. There was also a lower-level "alert" in the adjacent provinces of Artemisa and Mayabeque. Over 1,000 people fled their homes due to flooding, especially along the Cuyaguateje River in Pinar del Río Province. The city of Las Martinas received more than 10 inches (250 mm) of rainfall in 24 hours; a few other locations reported over 8 inches (200 mm) of rain. Of the 24 dams in Pinar del Río Province, six had already filled by June 5. The disturbance spawned a tornado in that area, which damaged three homes; four other tornadoes also touched down throughout the country.

=== United States ===
==== Southeastern United States ====
===== Florida =====
Radar loop of Tropical Storm Andrea crossing Florida

Along the Florida coast, storm surge produced by Andrea remained relatively minor, with surge heights ranging from 2–4 ft (0.61–1.22 m) across the state's Gulf coast. These measurements peaked in Cedar Key, where a station documented a storm surge height of 4.08 ft (1.24 m); the same station recorded a storm tide height of 6.26 ft (1.91 m). The highest wind measurement was at a mesonet site in Davis Islands, which observed sustained winds of 47 mph (76 km/h). A total of 10 tornadoes were spawned in Florida. Near Myakka City, a tornado damaged the roofs of three single family homes, six pole barns, and four outbuildings. One horse and six chickens were killed, and another horse and two dogs were injured. Significant piles of debris and downed power lines covered SR 70 in Myakka City. Damage was estimated at $50,000. Another twister spawned in Sun City Center downed trees and damaged lanais, fascia and shingles. Damage reached approximately $36,000.

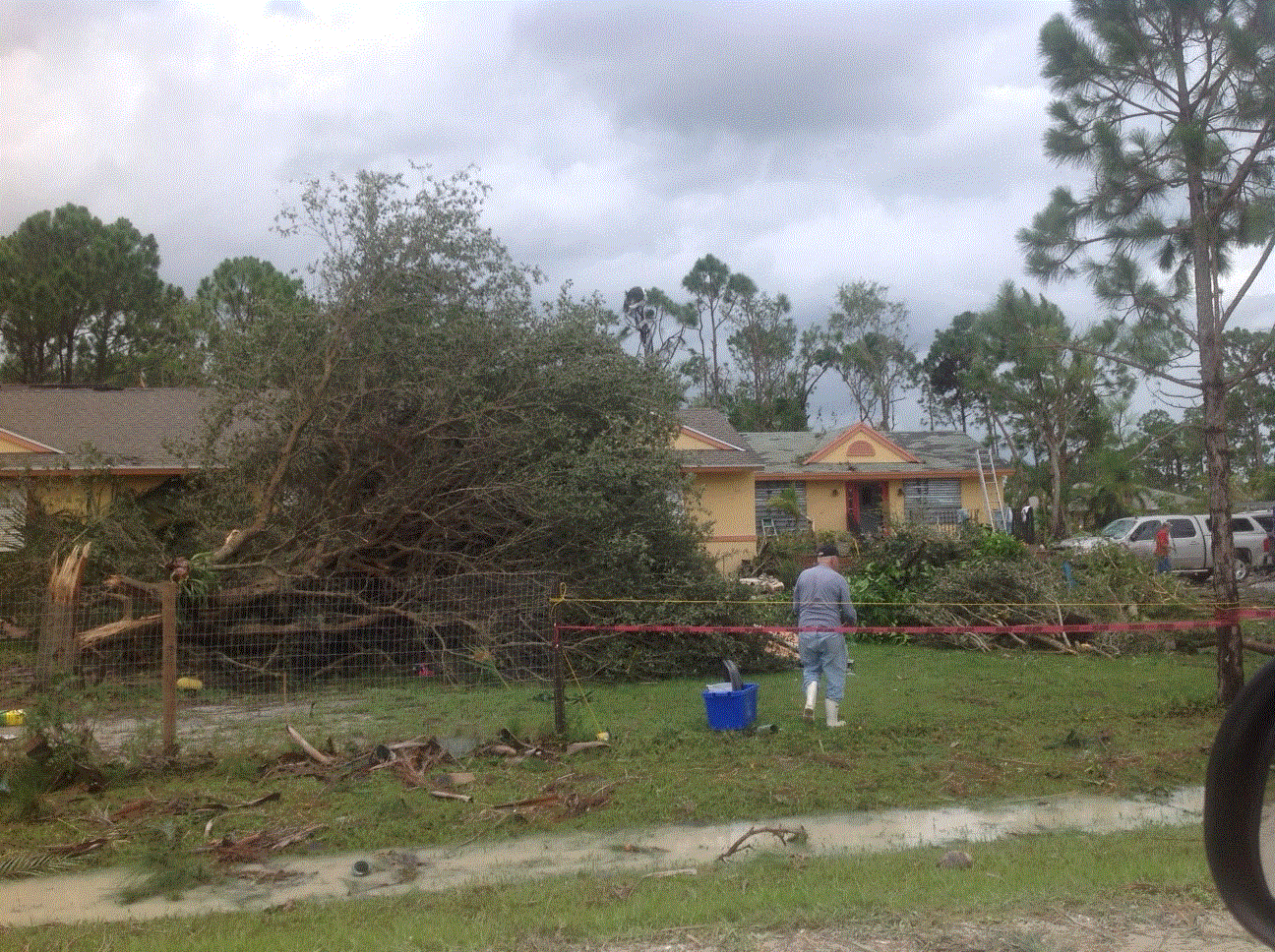
Damage from the tornado spawned in The Acreage.

Andrea dropped locally heavy rainfall in some areas of West Central Florida, with a Community Collaborative Rain, Hail and Snow Network (CoCoRaHS) station observing 6.17 inches (157 mm) inches of precipitation near Chiefland. Minor street flooding was reported in several counties. Near the city of Coachman, the weight of saturated leaves on the roof of a dog kennel at the Pinellas County Humane Society caused a large section of the roof to collapse. In East Central Florida, the storm produced about 2–3 inches (51–76 mm) of rain, with isolated totals of 5–6 inches (130–150 mm) over a three-day period in Orange, Osceola, and Volusia counties. In North Florida, the storm spawned a tornado at the Naval Station Mayport in Jacksonville. A number of "non-critical" structures suffered minor impact, while other buildings experienced damaged roofs and broken windows. Strong winds were also observed in the area, with gusts up to 83 mph (134 km/h) at the Jacksonville Beach Pier; this was the strongest wind gust associated with the storm. Another tornado was spawned on Amelia Island in Fernandina Beach, though it caused minimal damage.

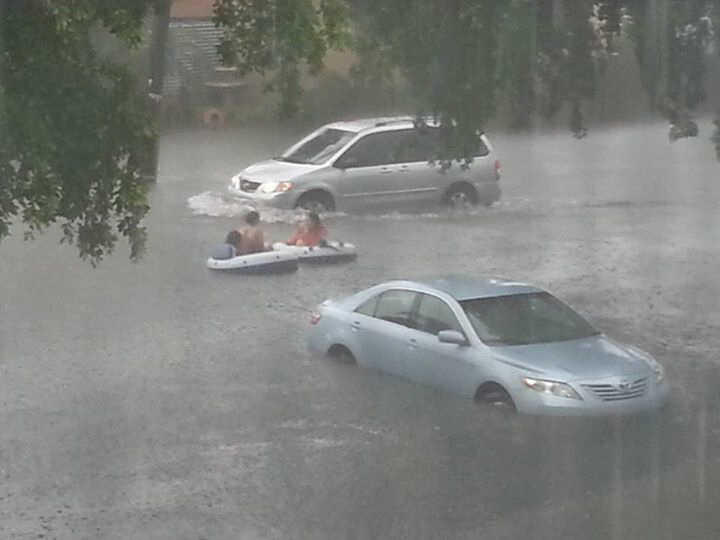
Flooding from Tropical Storm Andrea in northeastern Miami-Dade County.

Of the ten tornadoes in Florida, three were spawned in the southern portions of the state. In The Acreage, an EF1 tornado caused minor to moderate roof damage to several homes, mainly in the form of shingles and roof covering torn off. Numerous trees were uprooted or snapped near the trunk, along with several branches falling; this resulted in broken windows in several homes. At one home, the garage door was damaged, causing the door to blow in, which in turn led to the roof being damaged above the garage. An 85-year-old woman was injured after being struck by a falling branch of an oak tree, which broke through her bedroom window. A few vehicles were moved from their original locations, while a 30 feet (9.1 m) boat was flipped on its side. Another tornado in Belle Glade damaged an awning and downed trees and several power lines. Further south, an EF0 tornado touched down in Broward County and entered Palm Beach County before lifting back up; it resulted in no damage.

A convective band associated with Tropical Storm Andrea moved slowly across South Florida, prompting flash flood warnings for Broward and Miami-Dade County Counties. Precipitation peaked at 14.27 inches (362 mm) in North Miami Beach, 13.96 inches (355 mm) of which fell in a 24-hour period. Roads became impassable in the Waterways community in Aventura, leaving over 50 vehicles disabled. In nearby Golden Beach, hundreds of people became stranded in their vehicles, according to city officials. At the Biscayne Bay Campus of Florida International University, 11.71 inches (297 mm) of rain was observed. A number of stalled vehicles and impassable roads were reported in North Miami, while 24 families were forced to evacuate due to flooding. Further north in Broward County, the city of Hollywood was particularly hard hit, with 9 inches (230 mm) of rain observed. Several vehicles became disabled after retention ponds overflowed.

===== Elsewhere =====
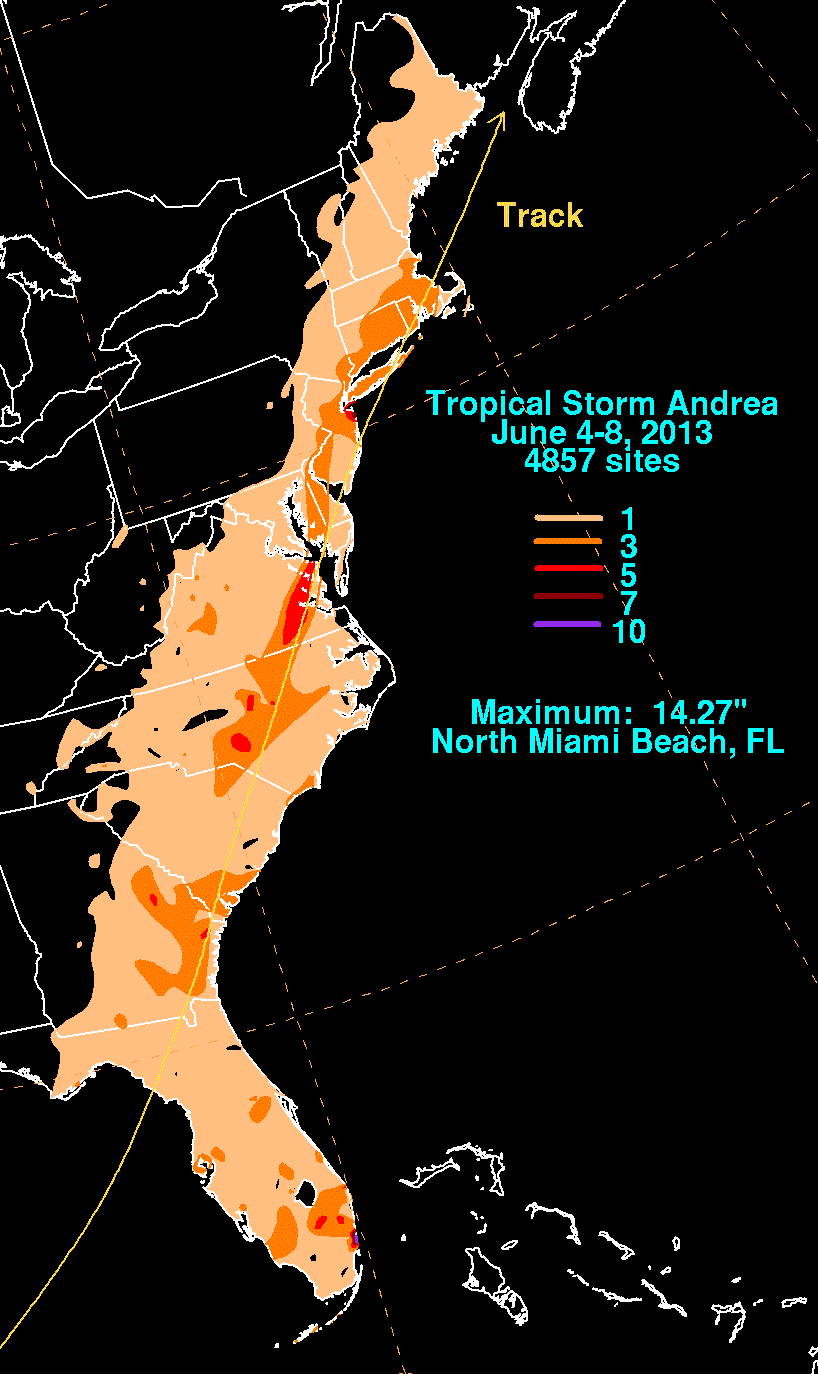
Rainfall totals in the United States in associated with Tropical Storm Andrea

Along the coast of Alabama, 13 swimmers were rescued due to strong rip currents. In Georgia, the storm brought gusty winds to the coast, reaching 32 mph (51 km/h) at Fort Pulaski. Wind damage was minor, limited to mostly downed trees and power lines in several counties; in Chatham County, a falling tree struck a house. Generally light rainfall was reported across much of southern and eastern Georgia, though up to 5.34 inches (136 mm) fell near Richmond Hill. In Chatham County, a portion of U.S. Route 25 was temporarily closed due to flooding. Along the coast of South Carolina, a storm surge of 3.55 feet (1.08 m) was observed in Beaufort County. A surfer in Horry County went missing and was later presumed to have drowned. In several counties along the coast or just inland, trees and power lines were downed. Andrea dropped light rainfall in the state, peaking at 4.9 inches (120 mm) near Cordova.

The storm brought significant amounts of rainfall to North Carolina in short periods of time, with a peak amount of 7.41 inches (188 mm) near Cameron. In Raleigh, 5.14 inches (131 mm) of rain fell in 24 hours, which broke the highest daily precipitation record for the city. Additionally, this total exceeded the average rainfall amount for the month of June. Many streams, creeks, and river overflowed in eastern North Carolina, resulting in numerous street closures in several counties. The Crabtree Valley Mall in Raleigh was closed after the parking lots became inundated. A number of low-lying and creek-side communities in Apex, Cary, Clayton, Durham, and Raleigh were flooded. An EF0 tornado was spawned near Varnamtown, where it downed several trees and damaged a large storage building.

==== Mid-Atlantic ====
The storm produced over 5 inches (130 mm) of rain in southeastern Virginia, with up to 7.73 inches (196 mm) in Williamsburg. Several roads in Accomack County were left impassable due to high water. One indirect death occurred due to a car accident in southwestern Virginia on June 7. In Maryland, rainfall in the eastern portion of the state was generally between 3 and 6 inches (76 and 152 mm). Poor drainage in some areas resulted in multiple road closures in Caroline and Talbot counties, the latter of which reported about 20 roads shutdown. Radar estimates of precipitation in Delaware were between 2 and 4 inches (51 and 102 mm), while 5.19 inches (132 mm) was observed in Smyrna. Flash flooding occurred in areas of poor drainage, causing several road closures, especially in central Delaware. Radar estimates of precipitation in eastern Pennsylvania ranged from 2 to 4 inches (51 to 102 mm), with a peak of 4.09 inches (104 mm) in Langhorne. There, the Neshaminy Creek reached 9 feet (2.7 m) above flood stage. In Delaware County, flooding was reporting along the Chester Creek.

Heavy rainfall was reported in New Jersey, amounting to more than 5 in (130 mm) in Oceanport. The heavy precipitation resulted in traffic jams and caused flooding along the Millstone and Raritan rivers. Three car accidents were blamed on the storm, two of which were fatal. Numerous roads flooded across the state, leading to several high-water rescues. Overflowing rivers and streams in Bergen and Union counties flooded low-lying and poor drainage areas. The Rockaway River at Boonton reached 5 feet (1.5 m) above flood stage from the afternoon of June 8 until the following morning. Winds of 35 mph (56 km/h) downed some trees and power lines, leaving 500–2,000 residences without power. A plane traveling from Palm Beach, Florida to Boston, Massachusetts had to make an emergency landing at Newark Liberty International Airport after being struck by lightning. In New York, 4.77 inches (121 mm) fell at Central Park in New York City in only a few hours, causing flash flooding in some areas. Train 3 on the New York City Subway briefly suspended service from 96th Street station to the 148th Street station.

==== Northeastern United States ====
In Connecticut, the storm dropped up to 6.64 inches (169 mm) in Gales Ferry, causing flash flooding in Fairfield and New London counties. About 3 to 5 inches (76 to 127 mm) of precipitation fell throughout Rhode Island, flooding many streets, several basements, and stranding a number of cars, particularly in Providence County. An exit ramp of I-95 in Providence was flooded with 1.5 feet (0.46 m) of water. An estimated 3 and 5 inches (76 and 127 mm) of precipitation fell in eastern Massachusetts. A number of roads were inundated in Bristol County, including Route 24 and Route 79 and the ramps onto I-95. Many cars were stranded in about 2 feet (0.61 m) of water in Fall River. Several basements were flooded in New Bedford, while several streets were flooded or left impassable. Elsewhere in New England, light rainfall was observed in Maine, New Hampshire, and Vermont.

=== Canada ===
As a post-tropical cyclone, Andrea brought rain and gale-force winds to Atlantic Canada. Officials closed the Confederation Bridge to high-profile vehicles due to the blustery conditions. More than 4,000 customers in Nova Scotia and parts of New Brunswick lost power as the storm moved through on June 8.

== See also ==
- Tropical Storm Alberto (2006)
- Tropical Storm Barry (2007)
- Tropical Storm Colin (2016)
- Timeline of the 2013 Atlantic hurricane season
- Other storms of the same name
