= Tropical Storm Harvey (2011) =

Atlantic tropical storm in 2011

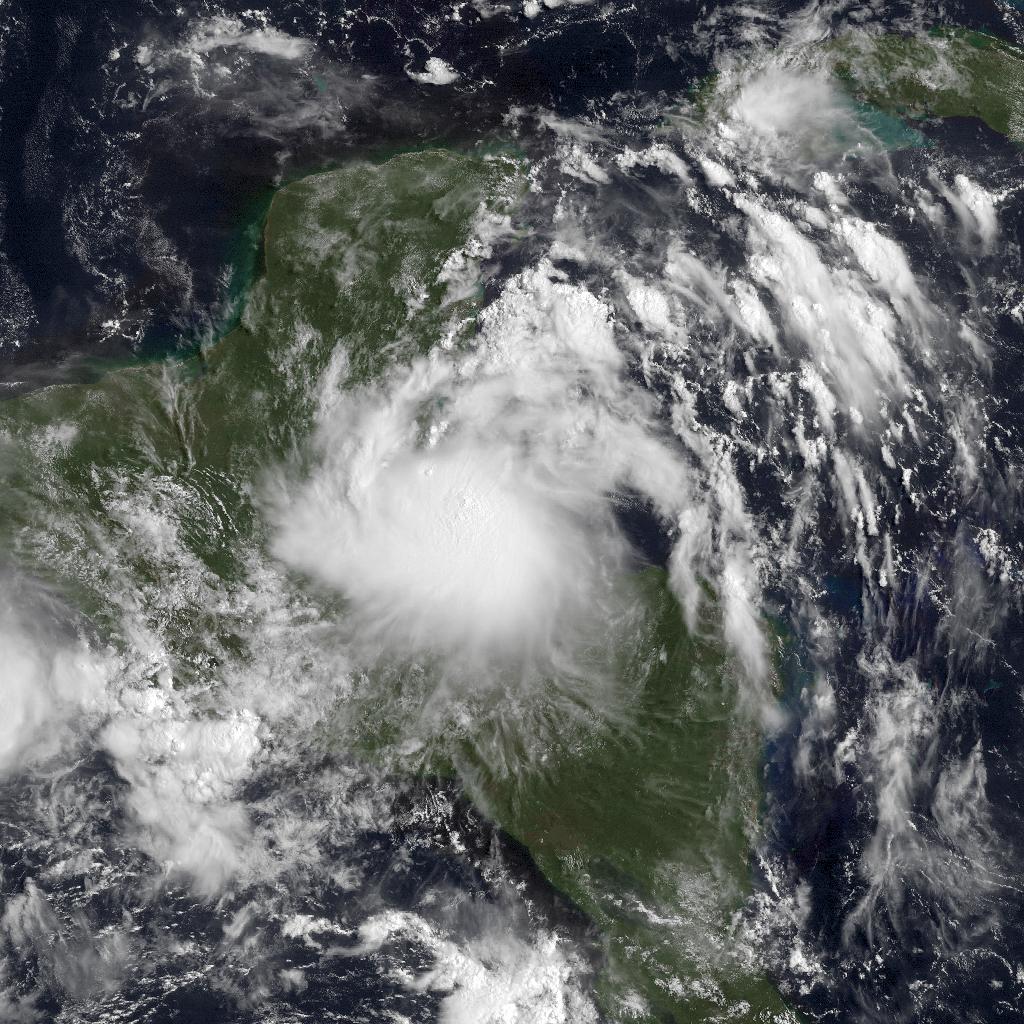
- Tropical Storm Harvey near peak intensity on August 20

Meteorological history
- Formed: August 19, 2011
- Dissipated: August 22, 2011

Tropical storm
- 1-minute sustained (SSHWS/NWS)
- Highest winds: 65 mph (100 km/h)
- Lowest pressure: 994 mbar (hPa); 29.35 inHg

Overall effects
- Fatalities: 5 direct
- Damage: Minimal
- Areas affected: Lesser Antilles, Hispaniola, Central America, Mexico
- IBTrACS /
- Part of the 2011 Atlantic hurricane season

Tropical Storm Harvey was the final tropical cyclone in a record-breaking string of consecutive storms that failed to attain hurricane intensity during the 2011 Atlantic hurricane season. The eighth tropical cyclone and eighth named storm of the season, Harvey developed from a tropical wave in the western Caribbean Sea on August 19. It moved over warm waters in the vicinity of Central America. Later on August 19, the system strengthened into Tropical Storm Harvey while just offshore Honduras. Additional organization occurred and Harvey attained its peak intensity of 65 mph (100 km/h) prior to coming ashore Belize on August 20. Harvey weakened to a tropical depression on August 21, but re-intensified to a tropical storm after emerging into the Bay of Campeche. Early on August 22, it made landfall in Veracruz, then weakened and dissipated several hours later.

The precursor disturbance caused thunderstorms throughout the Lesser Antilles, producing squally weather and gusty winds. On Saint Croix in the United States Virgin Islands, gusty winds downed trees, which struck power lines, leaving minor electrical outages. Along its path, Harvey dropped heavy rainfall across much of Central America. Strong winds and heavy precipitation were reported in the country of Belize. Heavy rains in Mexico triggered numerous landslides, one of which killed 3 people. Landslides in damaged 36 homes and 334 homes in the states of Chiapas and Veracruz, respectively. Heavy rainfall also caused rivers to overflow, damaging homes and businesses. Two additional people died in Mexico from unknown causes.

== Meteorological history ==
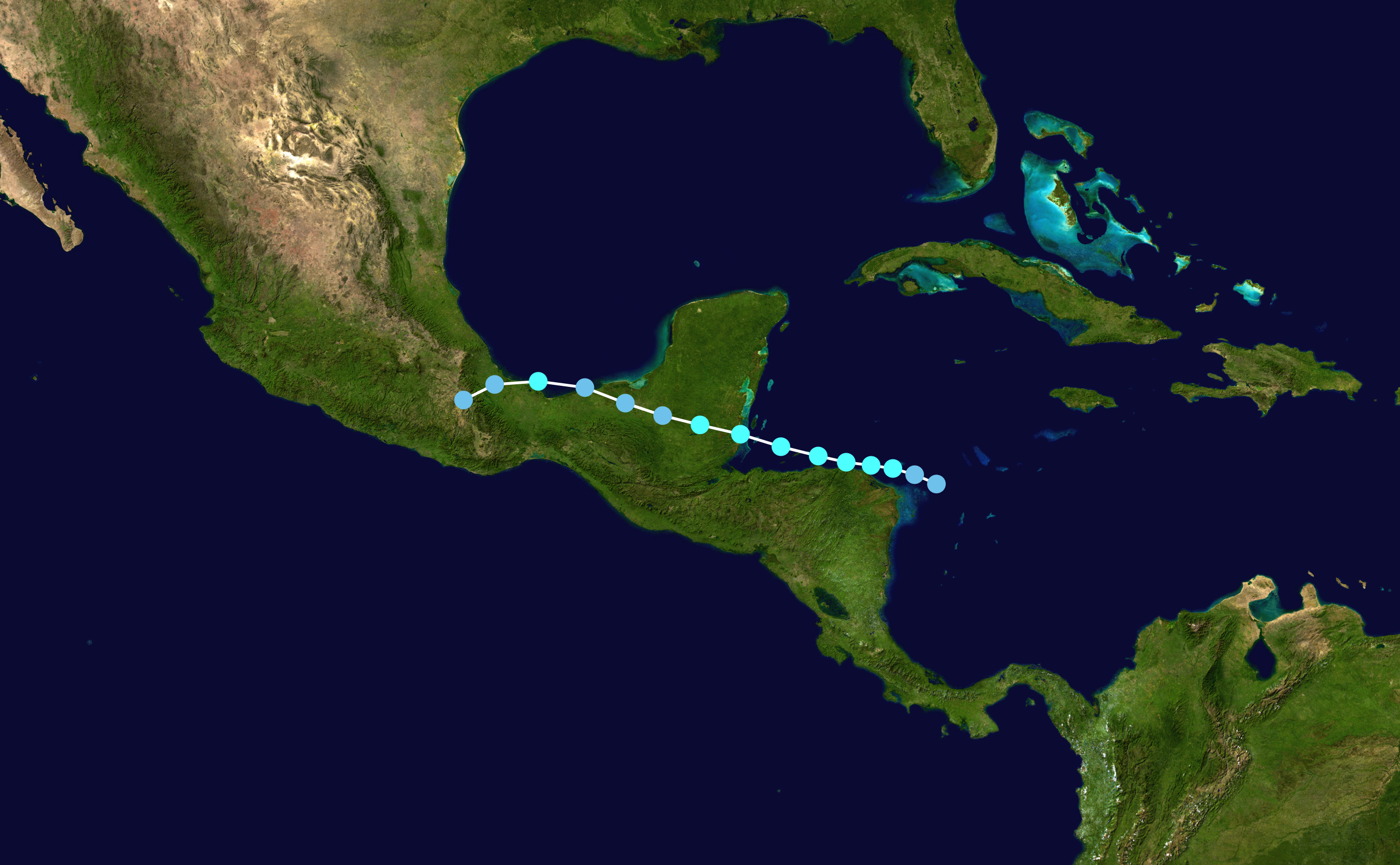
Map plotting the storm's track and intensity, according to the Saffir–Simpson scale Map key Saffir–Simpson scale Tropical depression (≤38 mph, ≤62 km/h) Tropical storm (39–73 mph, 63–118 km/h) Category 1 (74–95 mph, 119–153 km/h) Category 2 (96–110 mph, 154–177 km/h) Category 3 (111–129 mph, 178–208 km/h) Category 4 (130–156 mph, 209–251 km/h) Category 5 (≥157 mph, ≥252 km/h) Unknown Storm type Tropical cyclone Subtropical cyclone Extratropical cyclone, remnant low, tropical disturbance, or monsoon depression

A tropical wave exited the west coast of Africa on August 10. The wave was accompanied by a weak center of low pressure and patches of moderate to strong convection. In response, the National Hurricane Center (NHC) noted the potential for the wave to develop into a tropical cyclone. The wave continued westward at 15 to 20 mph (24 to 32 km/h) and became less vigorous over the next several days, with no strong convection present on August 13. Sporadic convection redeveloped over the course of the following day. Early the next day, the system was analyzed as an area of low pressure between Saint Lucia and Saint Vincent and an inverted trough extending well to the north.

The wave moved westward through the Caribbean Sea and produced areas of heavy showers and thunderstorms, although convection on the northern side of the system was limited, possibly a result of excessive Saharan dust. Mid-level cyclonic turning became more pronounced by early on August 17. Although a closed center of circulation was still lacking, conditions were becoming more favorable for the tropical cyclogenesis. By early on August 18, the NHC issued a "high chance" of the wave becoming a tropical cyclone within 48 hours. After a low-level circulation became identifiable, the system was designated as Tropical Depression Eight at 1800 UTC on August 18, while located about 100 mi (160 km) east-northeast of Cape Gracias a Dios.

Steered by a building high pressure area over the Gulf of Mexico, the cyclone remained on its westward course and was expected to move westward throughout its duration. Continuing to deepen, Tropical Depression Eight strengthened into Tropical Storm Harvey at 1200 UTC on August 19. Harvey continued to strengthen throughout the afternoon, with an improved appearance on visible satellite imagery and good outflow across the northwestern part of the storm. A discussion by the NHC early on August 20 indicated the potential for Harvey to strengthen into a hurricane prior to landfall, but this never materialized. At 0600 UTC on August 20, the storm attained its minimum barometric pressure of 994 mbar (29.4 inHg). Winds increased slightly further, and at 1730 UTC on August 20, Harvey made landfall near Dangriga, Belize with winds of 65 mph (100 km/h). While located over northeastern Guatemala early on August 21, the system weakened to a tropical depression. Harvey reached the Bay of Campeche early on August 22, where a convective burst allowed it to briefly re-strengthen into a tropical storm. By 0200 UTC, Harvey made landfall near Punta Roca Partida, Veracruz with winds of 40 mph (65 km/h). The system weakened back to a tropical depression at 0600 UTC on August 22. About twelve hours later, Harvey dissipated over Oaxaca.

== Preparations and impact ==
Harvey approaching its second landfall

=== Caribbean Sea ===
Prior to becoming a tropical cyclone, Harvey's precursor disturbance produced squally conditions, including intermittent torrents and gusty winds, to much of the Lesser Antilles. Coinciding with the typical rainy season, which lasts from July to October and is characterized by frequent tropical waves, the wave triggered heavy rainfall on the island of Guadeloupe. Precipitation totals commonly exceeded 2 to 3 in (51 to 76 mm), and across the mountains of the Basse-Terre area, up to 10 in (250 mm) of rainfall was reported.

On Saint Croix, a sensor at Salt River Bay recorded a wind gust of 50 mph (80 km/h). Strong winds brought down one large tree and resulted in minor power outages, although workers quickly arrived to restore electricity. Despite an urban and small-stream flood advisory for the island, minimal precipitation was recorded. Under 0.5 in (13 mm) of rain fell on Saint Croix, while just a trace of precipitation was observed on Saint Thomas. The system brushed Puerto Rico as it passed to south, with wind gusts reaching 60 mph (97 km/h). Mostly minor damage was reported. Scattered shower and thunderstorm activity also affected parts of the Dominican Republic, where residents were warned of the potential for flash flooding and mudslides and for the potential for rivers to rise above their banks.

=== Central America and Mexico ===
With the storm expected to continue on its westward track, tropical storm watches were posted for the northern of Honduras and the Caribbean coast of Guatemala. Tropical storm warnings were issued for the coast of Belize, the southeastern coast of the Yucatán Peninsula, and the Bay Islands Department of Honduras. A "red alert" was declared for five departments of Honduras, including Colón, Atlantida, Cortés, and Islas de la Bahia. Two other departments, Gracias a Dios and Yoro, were under a "yellow alert". Additionally, a "green alert" was issued for the departments of Olancho and Santa Bárbara. Shelters were prepared in case of an evacuation.

Rainfall in Honduras peaked at 7.48 inches (190 mm) in Roatán, located in the Bay Islands Department. However, no damage was reported in the country. In Belize, between 2 and 5 inches (51 and 127 mm) of rainfall was reported in the southern districts, while 3.4 inches (86 mm) fell in Belmopan. This caused flash flooding in low-lying areas. Some houses were damaged and destroyed in Crooked Tree. Additionally, a church at San Lazaro in Orange Walk District suffered severe damage. A tornado also caused wind damage in a few villages in northern Belize. As outer rainbands began to drop heavy precipitation in parts of northern Guatemala, authorities issued orange alerts for high-risk areas, with a yellow alert remaining in effect nationwide.

In Mexico, heavy rains from Harvey triggered several landslides, one of which killed three people. Two other people died from unknown causes. The most significant impact took place in Veracruz where 334 homes were damaged by the storm. In Guerrero, significant flooding damaged a bridge and isolated the town of Xaltianguis. Heavy rains in Chiapas caused several rivers to overflow their banks, causing moderate flooding in several towns and cities. Landslides associated with the system damaged 36 homes and affected three highways in the state.

== See also ==
- Other storms named Harvey
- Tropical Storm Hermine (1980)
- Tropical Storm Chantal (2001)
- Tropical Storm Matthew (2010)
- Tropical Storm Barry (2013)
- Hurricane Nana (2020)
