= List of storms named Harvey =

The name Harvey was used for six tropical cyclones in the Atlantic Ocean and twice in the Australian region.

In the Atlantic Ocean:

- Hurricane Harvey (1981) – threatened Bermuda but moved away.
- Hurricane Harvey (1993) – short-lived storm that did not threaten land.
- Tropical Storm Harvey (1999) – Made landfall in Florida, causing $15 million in damage.
- Tropical Storm Harvey (2005) – threatened Bermuda.
- Tropical Storm Harvey (2011) – strong tropical storm that affected parts of Central America.
- Hurricane Harvey (2017) – Category 4 hurricane that caused catastrophic flooding in Texas.

The name Harvey was retired after the 2017 season due to the extensive amount of damage and loss of life it caused along its track. It has been replaced with Harold for the 2023 season.

In the Australian region:

- Cyclone Harvey (1984)
- Cyclone Harvey (2005)
