= Tropical Storm Barry (2013) =

Atlantic tropical storm in 2013

- Tropical Storm Barry at peak intensity near landfall in Mexico on June 20

Meteorological history
- Formed: June 17, 2013
- Dissipated: June 20, 2013

Tropical storm
- 1-minute sustained (SSHWS/NWS)
- Highest winds: 45 mph (75 km/h)
- Lowest pressure: 1003 mbar (hPa); 29.62 inHg

Overall effects
- Fatalities: 5 total
- Damage: $355 million (2013 USD)
- Areas affected: Central America, Mexico
- IBTrACS
- Part of the 2013 Atlantic hurricane season

Tropical Storm Barry was a weak and short-lived tropical cyclone that brought heavy rains to parts of Central America and Mexico in June 2013. Barry originated from a tropical wave that developed in the southern Caribbean Sea. The wave tracked northwestward and began to develop in marginally favorable conditions. On June 17, the disturbance was upgraded to Tropical Depression Two by the National Hurricane Center. Due to its close proximity to land, the system failed to intensify before crossing the southern Yucatán Peninsula. The depression emerged over the Bay of Campeche late on June 18 and became increasingly organized. During the afternoon of June 19, data from Hurricane Hunters revealed the system had intensified into a tropical storm. The newly named Barry attained peak winds of 45 mph (75 km/h) before making landfall in Veracruz, Mexico on June 20. Once onshore, the storm quickly weakened and degenerated into a remnant low that night.

Areas from northern Nicaragua to South-Central Mexico experienced heavy rains from the storm, with notable flooding occurring in many areas. Swollen rivers displaced thousands in Veracruz and killed two people, while two others were killed by a river in Oaxaca. In El Salvador, one person was killed by flooding.

== Meteorological history ==
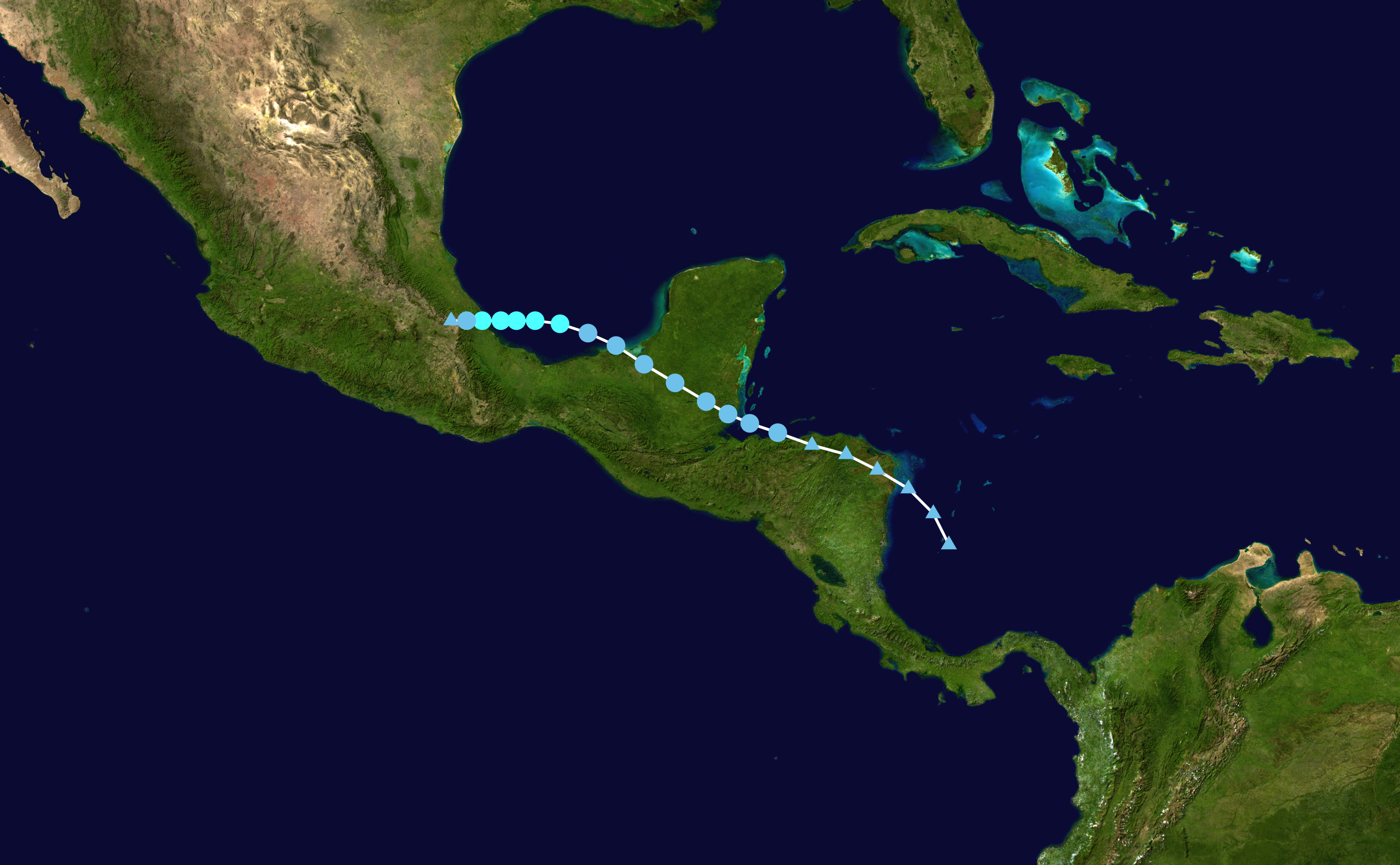
Map plotting the storm's track and intensity, according to the Saffir–Simpson scale Map key Saffir–Simpson scale Tropical depression (≤38 mph, ≤62 km/h) Tropical storm (39–73 mph, 63–118 km/h) Category 1 (74–95 mph, 119–153 km/h) Category 2 (96–110 mph, 154–177 km/h) Category 3 (111–129 mph, 178–208 km/h) Category 4 (130–156 mph, 209–251 km/h) Category 5 (≥157 mph, ≥252 km/h) Unknown Storm type Tropical cyclone Subtropical cyclone Extratropical cyclone, remnant low, tropical disturbance, or monsoon depression

On June 8, a tropical wave exited the west coast of Africa, moving quickly westward without development. During the evening hours of June 15, the National Hurricane Center (NHC) began monitoring a large area of disturbed weather in association with a tropical wave over the southwestern Caribbean Sea. That day, a low pressure area developed just north of Panama. Drifting west-northwest, environmental conditions were expected to be favorable for organization, but the system moved over eastern Nicaragua on June 16. Despite moving over land, the circulation and convection became better organized, and after it emerged over open waters, the system developed into Tropical Depression Two at 1200 UTC on June 17 about 25 mi (45 km) north-northwest of La Ceiba, Honduras. Located about 60 mi (95 km) east of Monkey River Town, Belize, the depression was not expected to undergo significant strengthening. Failing to intensify, the depression made landfall in southern Belize near Big Creek late on June 17 with winds estimated at 35 mph (55 km/h). Despite a waning structure, the NHC noted that if the system emerged into the Bay of Campeche, re-development and intensification was plausible.

While traversing the southern Yucatán Peninsula, the system nearly degenerated into a remnant low during the afternoon of June 18; however, as it neared water, sufficient convection redeveloped to maintain the system as a tropical depression. The circulation contracted over land and emerged into the warm waters of the Bay of Campeche that day. The system became increasingly organized as it turned westward in response to a mid-level ridge over the northwestern Gulf of Mexico. A Hurricane Hunter reconnaissance mission into the depression during the afternoon of June 19 revealed gale-force winds, prompting the NHC to upgrade and name the system Tropical Storm Barry. Based on a reconnaissance flight and Dvorak estimates, it was estimated that Barry attained peak winds of 75 km/h (45 mph) late on June 19. At 1115 UTC on June 20, Barry made landfall at Laguna La Mancha, just north of Veracruz, Mexico. Hours after moving inland, Barry weakened to a tropical depression as it interacted with the high terrain of Mexico. The center of circulation became increasingly ill-defined, with the majority of convection located well away from the center. Late on June 20, Barry dissipated over the Mexican state of Puebla.

== Preparations and impact ==
Tropical Depression Two over the Yucatán Peninsula on June 18.

=== Central America and Yucatán ===
The precursor to Barry produced significant rains in Nicaragua, causing flooding in 14 districts in the North Caribbean Coast Autonomous Region. Heavy rains in Honduras, peaking at 4 in (100 mm) in La Ceiba, resulted in floods that damaged 60 homes and affected 300 people. Several landslides occurred in Iriona, blocking off roadways. A likely tornado struck the community of Limón, destroying 9 homes and damaging 91 more. Four people were injured when their home was lifted and dropped back down. In southern Belize, an estimated 10 in (250 mm) of rain fell in 24 hours, causing several rivers to top their banks. In some areas, culverts were washed away. At least 54 people living along Hope Creek were relocated to shelters. In El Salvador, six minors were swept away by a flooded creek; five were quickly rescued but one remains missing and is presumed killed. Two people were injured after being struck by lightning. In the Mexican state of Yucatán, wind gusts to 48 mph (77 km/h) and heavy rains downed trees and power lines. More than 26,000 residents temporarily lost hydroelectric power after lightning struck a power station and caused a fire.

=== Eastern Mexico ===
As Tropical Depression Two emerged into the Bay of Campeche on June 18, the Government of Mexico issued a tropical storm watch for coastal areas between Punta El Lagarto and Barra Da Nautla. The watch was upgraded to a tropical storm warning early on June 19. Following the storm's intensification that day, the warning was expanded northward to Tuxpan. Officials dispatched 34,250 workers to set up refugee camps throughout the state. Across Veracruz, approximately 2,000 people sought refuge in shelters. Classes were cancelled across more than 2,890 schools.

Heavy rains in Veracruz, peaking at 14.6 in (370 mm) in Misantla, brought more than a dozen rivers to critical levels and triggered flash floods that killed two people. A 48-year-old man drowned while riding a horse after he was swept away by an overflowing river. As a precautionary measure, officials urged 4,000 residents along La Antigua River to evacuate. Several landslides occurred in the states of Guerrero and Puebla. In Oaxaca, a woman and her child drowned after their van was swept away by an overflowing river. In Veracruz, significant damage was reported across eight municipalities. Three people were injured and more than 1,200 residents were evacuated from flooded areas. At least twelve sections of a highway were damaged. At least sixteen communities and 400 residents were left isolated after flooding damaged roads. Severe weather downed a tree, destroying a bus stop shelter. More than 20,000 homes, 106 neighborhoods, 494 communities, 40 towns, 19 schools, and four health centers suffered flood damage. Total damage in Veracruz was estimated to be Mex$4.53 billion (US$355 million). At least 2,500 people were displaced. At least 50 patients were evacuated after several hospitals were flooded. In the aftermath of the storm, a state of emergency was declared across 109 municipalities.

== See also ==
- Other storms of the same name
- Timeline of the 2013 Atlantic hurricane season
- Tropical Storm Hermine (1980)
- Tropical Storm Harvey (2011)
