= Timeline of the 2013 Atlantic hurricane season =

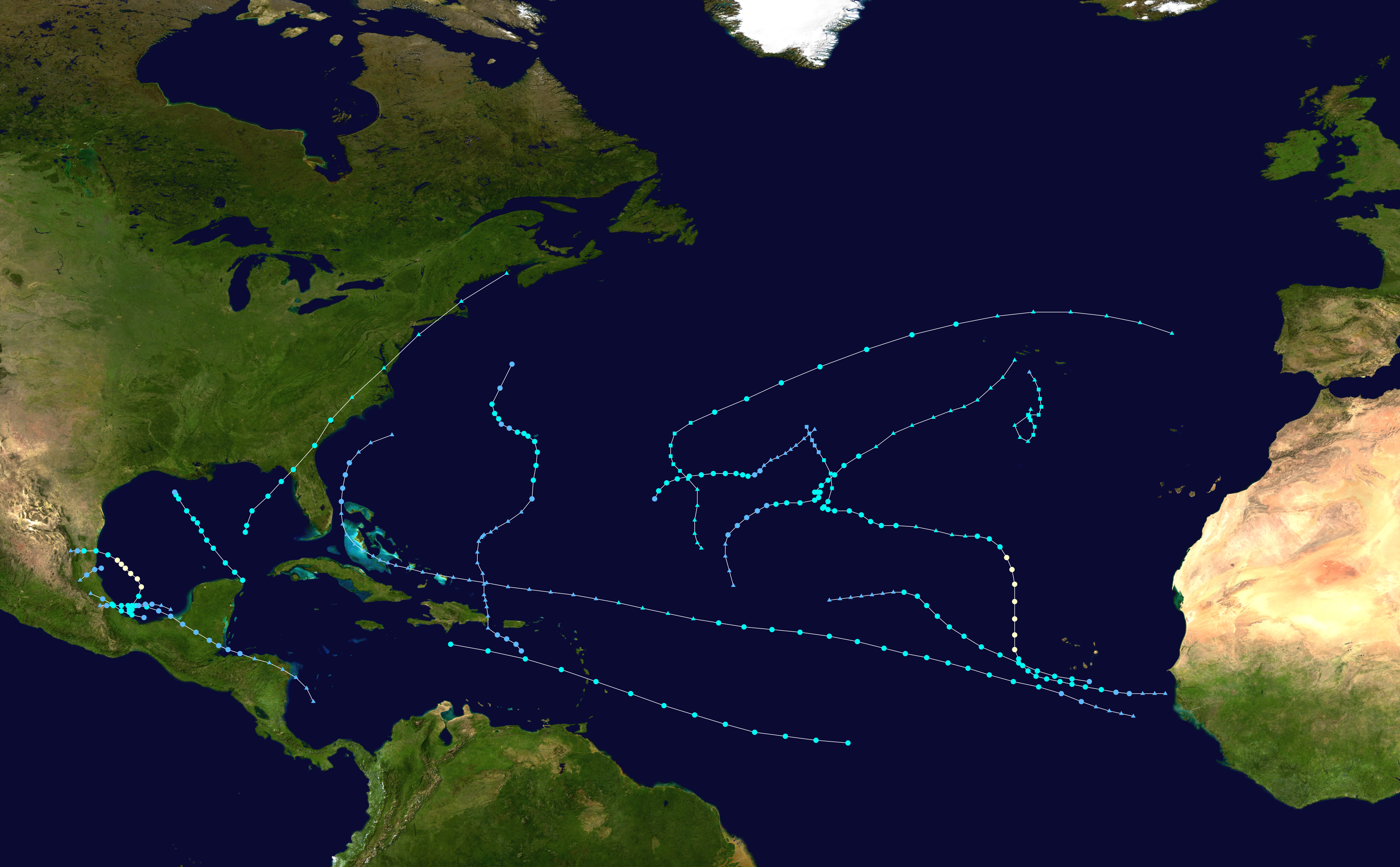
- Season summary map

Season boundaries
- First system formed: June 5, 2013
- Last system dissipated: December 7, 2013

Strongest system
- Name: Humberto
- Maximum winds: 90 mph (150 km/h) (1-minute sustained)
- Lowest pressure: 979 mbar (hPa; 28.91 inHg)

Longest lasting system
- Name: Humberto
- Duration: 11 days
Storm articles
- Tropical Storm Andrea (2013)
- Tropical Storm Barry (2013)
- Hurricane Ingrid

The 2013 Atlantic hurricane season was an event in the annual hurricane season in the north Atlantic Ocean. It featured below-average tropical cyclone activity, (Note: An average Atlantic hurricane season, as defined by the National Oceanic and Atmospheric Administration, has 12 tropical storms, six hurricanes and two major hurricanes.) with the fewest hurricanes since the 1982 season. The season officially began on June 1, 2013 and ended on November 30, 2013. These dates, adopted by convention, historically delimit the period in each year when most tropical systems form. The season's first storm, Tropical Storm Andrea formed on June 5, and its final storm, an unnamed subtropical storm, dissipated on December 7. Altogether, there were 13 named tropical storms during the season. Two of which attained hurricane strength, but neither intensified into a major hurricane, (Note: Hurricanes reaching Category 3 (wind speeds of 111 miles per hour (179 km/h)) or higher on the 5-level Saffir–Simpson wind speed scale are considered major hurricanes.) the first such occurrence since the 1994 season.

Despite the season's below-average activity overall, three Atlantic storms made Landfall in Mexico, two as tropical storms and one as a hurricane. (Note: Additionally, five eastern Pacific storms made Landfall in Mexico during the season, three as tropical storms and two as hurricanes.) Hurricane Ingrid made landfall on September 15, near La Pesca, Tamaulipas, on September 15, killing 23 and causing $1.5 billion (2013 USD) in damage. That same month, on the opposite side of the country, Hurricane Manuel made multiple landfalls along Mexico's Pacific coast, causing catastrophic damage. The only tropical storm to make landfall in the United States was Andrea. After coming ashore in Florida's Big Bend region, it killed at least three and brought tornadoes, heavy rainfall, and flooding to a large section of the U.S. East Coast and Atlantic Canada.

This timeline documents tropical cyclone formations, strengthening, weakening, landfalls, extratropical transitions, and dissipations during the season. It includes information that was not released throughout the season, meaning that data from post-storm reviews by the National Hurricane Center, such as a storm that was not initially warned upon, has been included.

The time stamp for each event is first stated using Coordinated Universal Time (UTC), the 24-hour clock where 00:00 = midnight UTC. The NHC uses both UTC and the time zone where the center of the tropical cyclone is currently located. The time zones utilized (east to west) prior to 2020 were: Atlantic, Eastern, and Central. In this timeline, the respective area time is included in parentheses. Additionally, figures for maximum sustained winds and position estimates are rounded to the nearest 5 units (miles, or kilometers), following National Hurricane Center practice. Direct wind observations are rounded to the nearest whole number. Atmospheric pressures are listed to the nearest millibar and nearest hundredth of an inch of mercury.

== Timeline ==
=== June ===
June 1

- The 2013 Atlantic hurricane season officially begins.

June 5

- 18:00 UTC (2:00 p.m. EDT) – Tropical Storm Andrea develops roughly 310 mi (500 km) southwest of Saint Petersburg, Florida.

Tropical Storm Andrea prior to landfall on June 6

June 6

- 12:00 UTC (8:00 a.m. EDT) – Tropical Storm Andrea attains maximum sustained winds of 65 mph (100 km/h).
- 22:00 UTC (6:00 p.m. EDT) – Tropical Storm Andrea makes landfall about 10 mi (15 km) south of Steinhatchee, Florida, with winds of 60 mph (95 km/h), and simultaneously attains its peak intensity with a minimum barometric pressure of 992 mb (hPa; 29.30 inHg).

June 7

- 18:00 UTC (2:00 p.m. EDT) – Tropical Storm Andrea transitions into an extratropical cyclone over northeastern South Carolina.

June 17

- 12:00 UTC (7:00 a.m. CDT) – Tropical Depression Two develops about 25 mi (40 km) north-northwest of La Ceiba, Honduras.
- 22:00 UTC (5:00 p.m. CDT)& – Tropical Depression Two makes its first landfall near Big Creek, Honduras, with winds of 35 mph (55 km/h).

June 19

- 12:00 UTC (7:00 a.m. CDT) – Tropical Depression Two intensifies into Tropical Storm Barry about 105 mi (165 km) north-northeast of Coatzacoalcos, Mexico.

June 20

- 00:00 UTC (7:00 p.m. CDT, June 19) – Tropical Storm Barry attains its peak intensity with maximum sustained winds of 45 mph (75 km/h) and a minimum barometric pressure of 1003 mb (hPa; 29.62 inHg).
- 11:15 UTC (6:15 a.m. CDT) – Tropical Storm Barry makes its second and final landfall near Laguna La Mancha, Mexico, with winds of 45 mph (75 km/h).
- 18:00 UTC (1:00 p.m. CDT) – Tropical Storm Barry weakens to a tropical depression.

June 21

- 00:00 UTC (7:00 p.m. CDT, June 20) – Tropical Depression Barry degenerates into a non-convective remnant area of low pressure over the Mexican state of Puebla.

=== July ===
July 7

- 12:00 UTC (8:00 a.m. AST) – Tropical Storm Chantal develops from an area of low pressure roughly 1245 mi (2000 km) east-southeast of Barbados.

Tropical Storm Chantal in the central Atlantic on July 8

July 9

- 12:00 UTC (8:00 a.m. AST) – Tropical Storm Chantal attains its peak intensity with maximum sustained winds of 65 mph (100 km/h) and a minimum barometric pressure of 1003 mb (hPa; 29.62 inHg) as it passes through the central Lesser Antilles.

July 10

- 18:00 UTC (2:00 p.m. EDT) – Tropical Storm Chantal dissipates south of Hispaniola.

July 23

- 18:00 UTC (2:00 p.m. AST) – Tropical Depression Four develops about 175 mi (280 km) south-southeast of the Cape Verde Islands.

July 24

- 06:00 UTC (2:00 a.m. AST) – Tropical Depression Four intensifies into Tropical Storm Dorian roughly 185 mi (300 km) west-southwest of the southernmost Cape Verde Islands.

July 25

- 06:00 UTC (2:00 a.m. AST) – Tropical Storm Dorian attains its peak intensity with maximum sustained winds of 60 mph (95 km/h) and a minimum barometric pressure of 1002 mb (hPa; 29.59 inHg).

July 27

- 18:00 UTC (2:00 p.m. AST) – Tropical Storm Dorian degenerates into a trough of low pressure about 575 mi (925 km) east of the northeastern Leeward Islands.

=== August ===
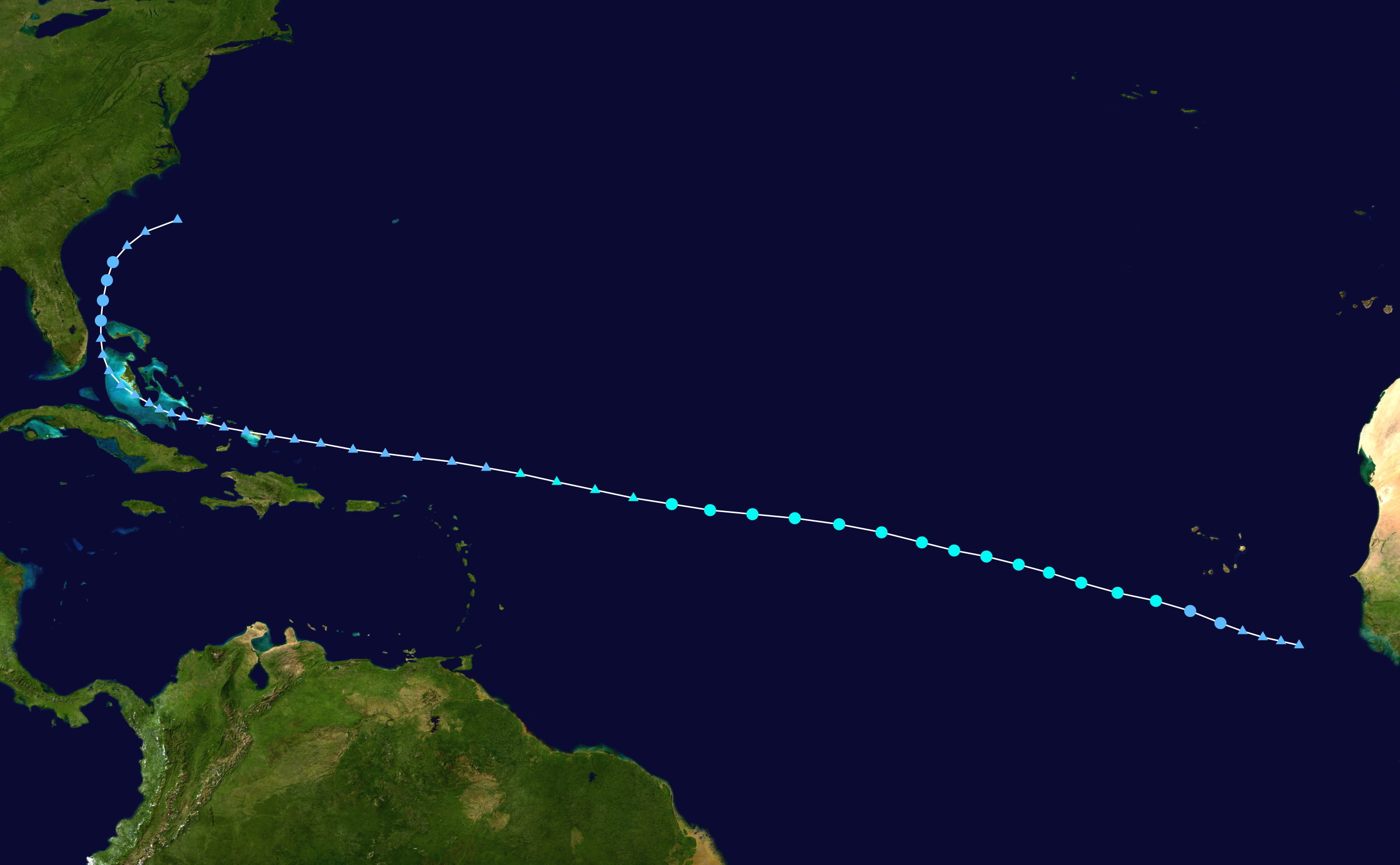
Storm path of Tropical Storm Dorian

August 2

- 18:00 UTC (2:00 p.m. EDT) – The remnants of Tropical Storm Dorian regenerate into a tropical depression roughly 75 mi (120 km) northwest of Freeport, Bahamas.

August 3

- 18:00 UTC (2:00 p.m. EDT) – Tropical Depression Dorian degenerates into a remnant area of low pressure about 165 mi (265 km) southeast of Charleston, South Carolina.

August 15

- 00:00 UTC (8:00 p.m. AST, August 14) – Tropical Depression Five develops roughly 70 mi (110 km) south of Praia, Cape Verde.
- 06:00 UTC (2:00 a.m. AST) – Tropical Depression Five intensifies into Tropical Storm Erin.

August 17

- 00:00 UTC (8:00 p.m. AST, August 16) – Tropical Storm Erin attains its peak intensity with maximum sustained winds of 45 mph (75 km/h) and a minimum barometric pressure of 1006 mb (hPa; 29.71 inHg).

August 18

- 06:00 UTC (2:00 a.m. AST) – Tropical Storm Erin degenerates into a non-convective remnant area of low pressure about midway between the western coast of Africa and the northern Leeward Islands.

Tropical Depression Six near tropical storm intensity on August 25

August 25

- 12:00 UTC (7:00 a.m. CDT) – Tropical Depression Six develops roughly 40 mi (65 km) north-northeast of Coatzacoalcos, Mexico.
- 18:00 UTC (1:00 p.m. CDT) – Tropical Depression Six intensifies into 2013 Atlantic hurricane season#Tropical Storm Fernand about 70 mi (110 km) east-southeast of Veracruz, Mexico.

August 26

- 00:00 UTC (7:00 p.m. CDT, August 25) – Tropical Storm Fernand attains its peak intensity with maximum sustained winds of 60 mph (95 km/h) and a minimum barometric pressure of 1001 mb (hPa; 29.56 inHg).
- 04:45 UTC (11:45 p.m. CDT August 25) – Tropical Storm Fernand makes landfall near Zempoala, Mexico, with winds of 60 mph (95 km/h).
- 12:00 UTC (7:00 a.m. CDT) – Tropical Storm Fernand weakens to a tropical depression.
- 18:00 UTC (1:00 p.m. CDT) – Tropical Depression Fernand degenerates into a non-convective remnant area of low pressure near Tulancingo, Mexico.

=== September ===
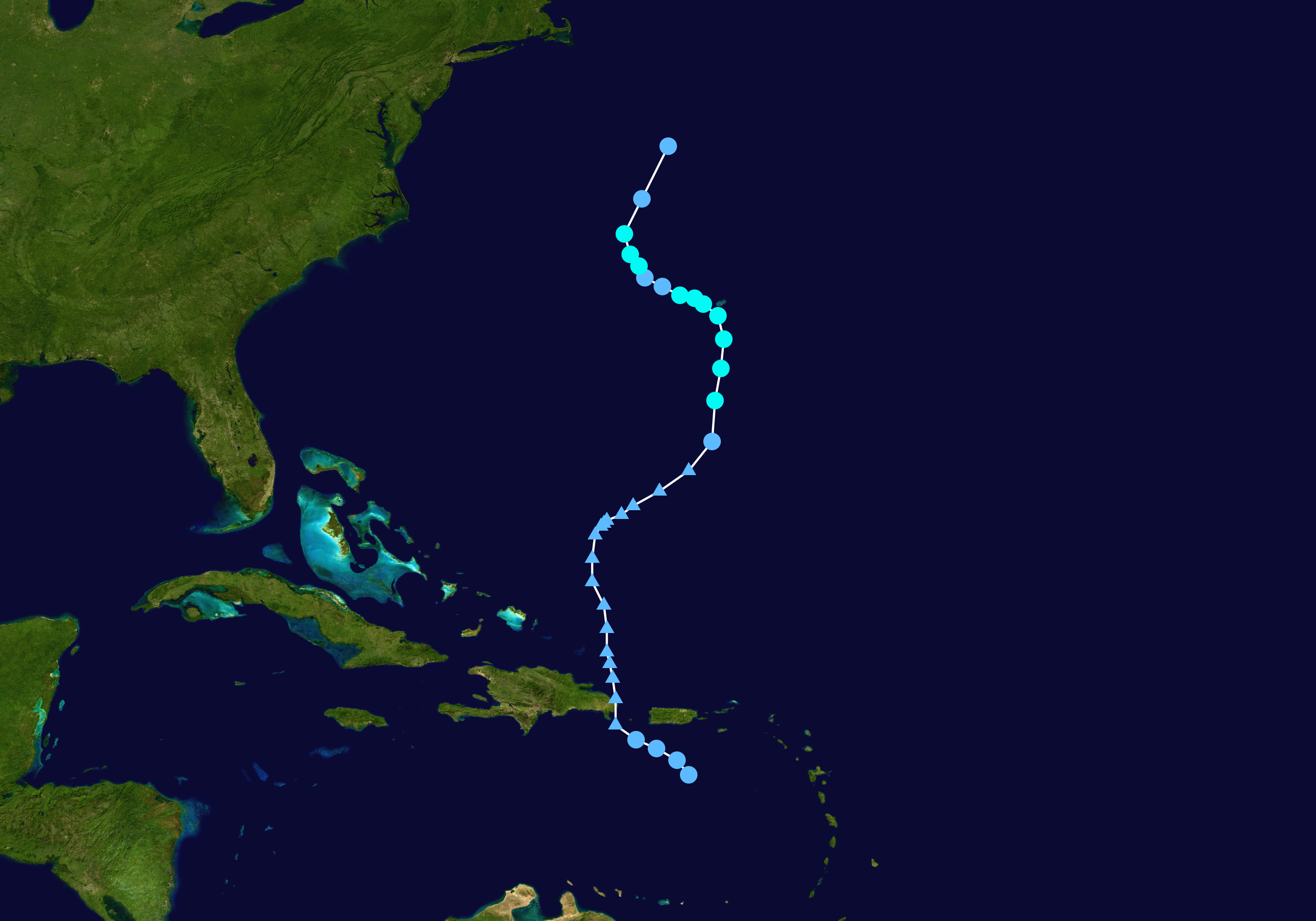
Storm path of Tropical Storm Gabrielle

September 4

- 18:00 UTC (2:00 p.m. AST) – Tropical Depression Seven develops roughly 115 mi (185 km) south-southeast of Puerto Rico.

September 5

- 18:00 UTC (2:00 p.m. AST) – Tropical Depression Seven degenerates into a tropical disturbance near the eastern tip of Hispaniola.

September 6

- 12:00 UTC (7:00 a.m. CDT) – Tropical Depression Eight develops roughly 30 mi (50 km) east-northeast of Tampico, Mexico.
- 18:00 UTC (1:00 p.m. CDT) – Tropical Depression Eight attains its peak intensity with maximum sustained winds of 35 mph (55 km/h) and a minimum barometric pressure of 1008 mb (29.77 inHg) and simultaneously makes landfall near Tampico, Mexico.

September 7

- 06:00 UTC (1:00 a.m. CDT) – Tropical Depression Eight degenerates into a non-convective remnant area of low pressure roughly 95 mi (155 km) southwest of Tampico, Mexico.

September 8

- 18:00 UTC (2:00 p.m. AST) – Tropical Depression Nine develops about 225 mi (360 km) west-southwest of Dakar, Africa.

September 9

- 06:00 UTC (2:00 a.m. AST) – Tropical Depression Nine intensifies into Tropical Storm Humberto roughly 145 mi (235 km) southeast of Praia, Cape Verde.

Hurricane Humberto shortly after peak intensity on September 12

September 10

- 00:00 UTC (8:00 p.m. AST, September 9) – The remnants of Tropical Depression Seven regenerate into a tropical depression about 345 mi (555 km) south of Bermuda.
- 06:00 UTC (2:00 a.m. AST) – Tropical Depression Seven intensifies into Tropical Storm Gabrielle roughly 225 mi (360 km) south of Bermuda.
- 12:00 UTC (8:00 a.m. AST) – Tropical Storm Gabrielle attains its peak intensity with maximum sustained winds of 65 mph (100 km/h) and a minimum barometric pressure of 1003 mb (hPa; 29.59 inHg).

September 11

- 12:00 UTC (8:00 a.m. AST) – Tropical Storm Humberto intensifies into a Category 1 hurricane, the first of the 2013 season, about 370 mi (595 km) west-northwest of Praia, Cape Verde.
- 18:00 UTC (2:00 p.m. AST) – Hurricane Humberto attains its peak intensity with maximum sustained winds of 90 mph (150 km) and a minimum barometric pressure of 979 mb (hPa; 28.91 inHg).

September 12

- 00:00 UTC (8:00 p.m. AST, September 11) – Tropical Storm Gabrielle weakens to a tropical depression.
- 12:00 UTC (8:00 a.m. AST) – Tropical Depression Gabrielle re-intensifies into a tropical storm about 190 mi (305 km) northwest of Bermuda.
- 18:00 UTC (1:00 p.m. CDT) – Tropical Depression Ten develops roughly 175 mi (280 km) east-northwest of Veracruz, Mexico.

September 13

- 06:00 UTC (2:00 a.m. AST) – Tropical Storm Gabrielle weakens to a tropical depression for a second time.
- 06:00 UTC (2:00 a.m. AST) – Hurricane Humberto weakens to a tropical storm about 755 mi (1,215 km) northwest of Praia, Cape Verde.
- 12:00 UTC (7:00 a.m. CDT) – Tropical Depression Ten intensifies into Tropical Storm Ingrid roughly 70 mi (110 km) east of Veracruz.
- 18:00 UTC (2:00 p.m. AST) – Tropical Depression Gabrielle dissipates north-northwest of Bermuda.

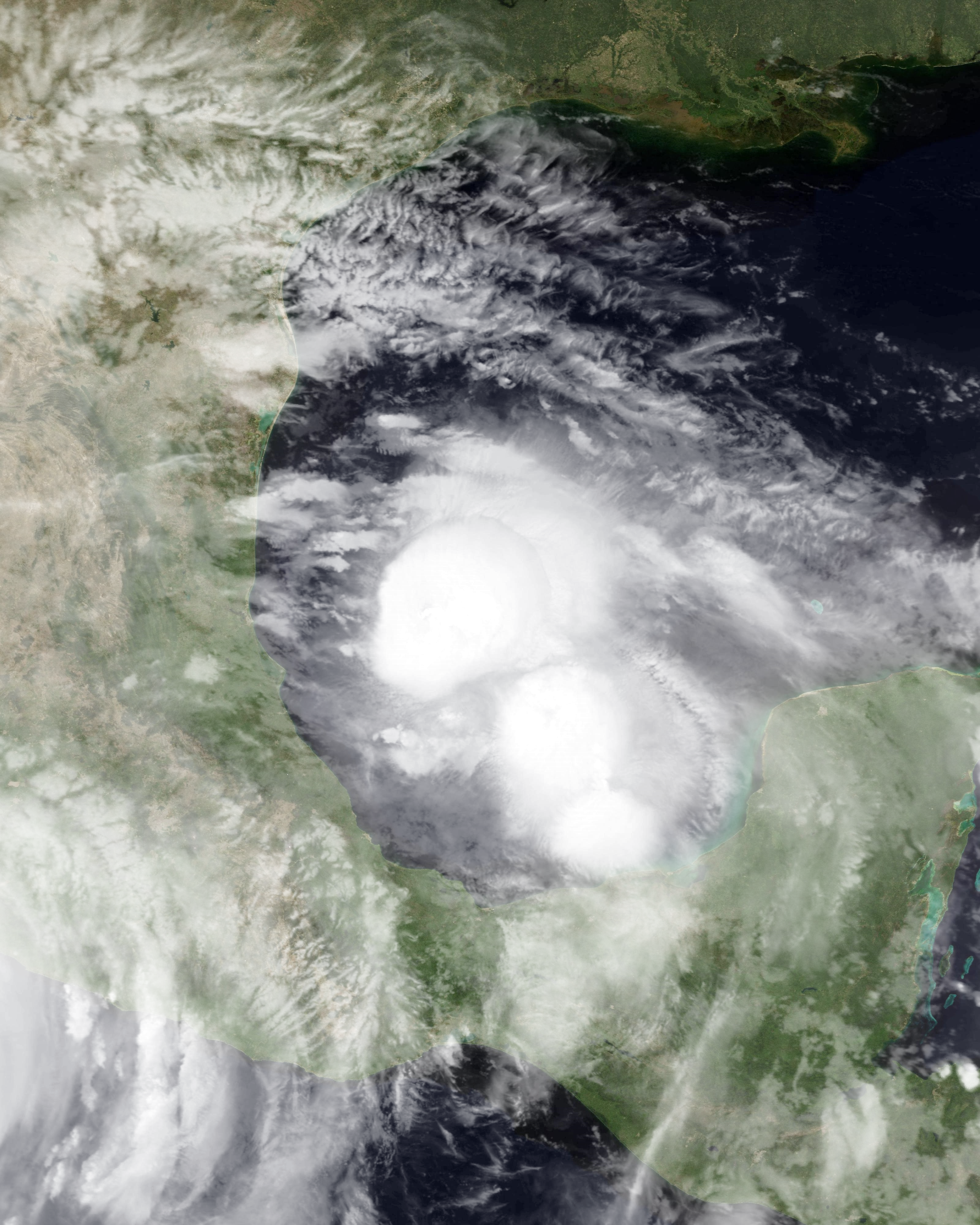
Ingrid shortly before becoming a hurricane on September 14

September 14

- 00:00 UTC (8:00 p.m. AST, September 13) – Tropical Storm Humberto degenerates into a non-convective remnant area of low pressure about 900 mi (1,450 km) northwest of Praia, Cape Verde.
- 18:00 UTC (1:00 p.m. CDT) – Tropical Storm Ingrid intensifies into a Category 1 hurricane about 170 mi (275 km) northeast of Veracruz, Mexico.

September 15

- 00:00 UTC (8:00 p.m. AST, September 14) – The remnants of Tropical Storm Humberto regenerate into a tropical storm roughly 1,095 mi (1,760 km) southwest of Ponta Delgada, Azores.
- 00:00 UTC (7:00 p.m. CDT September 14) – Hurricane Ingrid attains its peak intensity with maximum sustained winds of 85 mph (140 km/h) and a minimum barometric pressure of 983 mb (hPa; 29.03 inHg).

September 16

- 06:00 UTC (1:00 a.m. CDT) – Hurricane Ingrid weakens to a tropical storm about 100 mi (160 km) northeast of Tampico, Mexico.
- 11:15 UTC (6:15 a.m. CDT) – Tropical Storm Ingrid makes landfall near La Pesca, Mexico, with winds of 65 mph (100 km/h).

September 17

- 00:00 UTC (7:00 p.m. CDT, September 16) – Tropical Storm Ingrid weakens to a tropical depression about 90 mi (150 km/h) west of La Pesca, Mexico.
- 06:00 UTC (1:00 a.m. CDT) – Tropical Depression Ingrid degenerates into a non-convective remnant area of low pressure about 120 mi (195 km) west of La Pesca, Mexico.
- 12:00 UTC (8:00 a.m. AST) – Tropical Storm Humberto transitions into a subtropical storm.

September 18

- 06:00 UTC (2:00 a.m. AST) – Subtropical Storm Humberto weakens to a subtropical depression about 1,115 mi (1,795 km) southwest of Ponta Delgada.

September 19

- 12:00 UTC (8:00 a.m. AST) – Subtropical Depression Humberto dissipates southwest of the Azores.

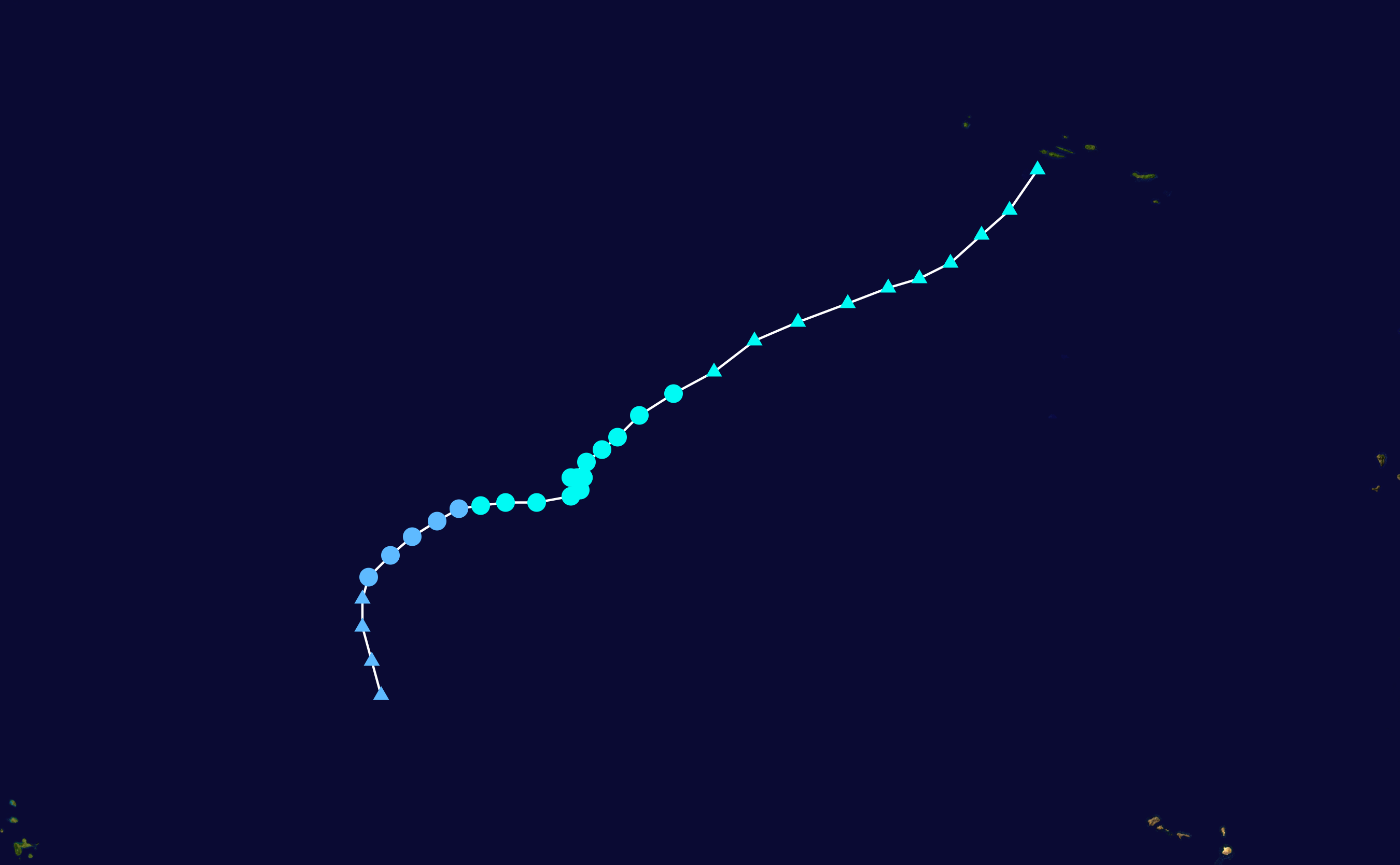
Storm path of Tropical Storm Jerry

September 29

- 00:00 UTC (8:00 p.m. AST, September 28) – Tropical Depression Eleven develops about 910 mi (1,465 km) east-northeast of the Leeward Islands.

September 30

- 06:00 UTC (2:00 a.m. AST) – Tropical Depression Eleven intensifies into Tropical Storm Jerry about 1,150 mi (1,850 km) west-southwest of the Azores.

=== October ===
October 1

- 00:00 UTC (8:00 p.m. AST, September 30) – Tropical Storm Jerry attains its peak intensity with maximum sustained winds of 50 mph (85 km/h) and a minimum barometric pressure of 1005 mb (hPa; 29.68 inHg).

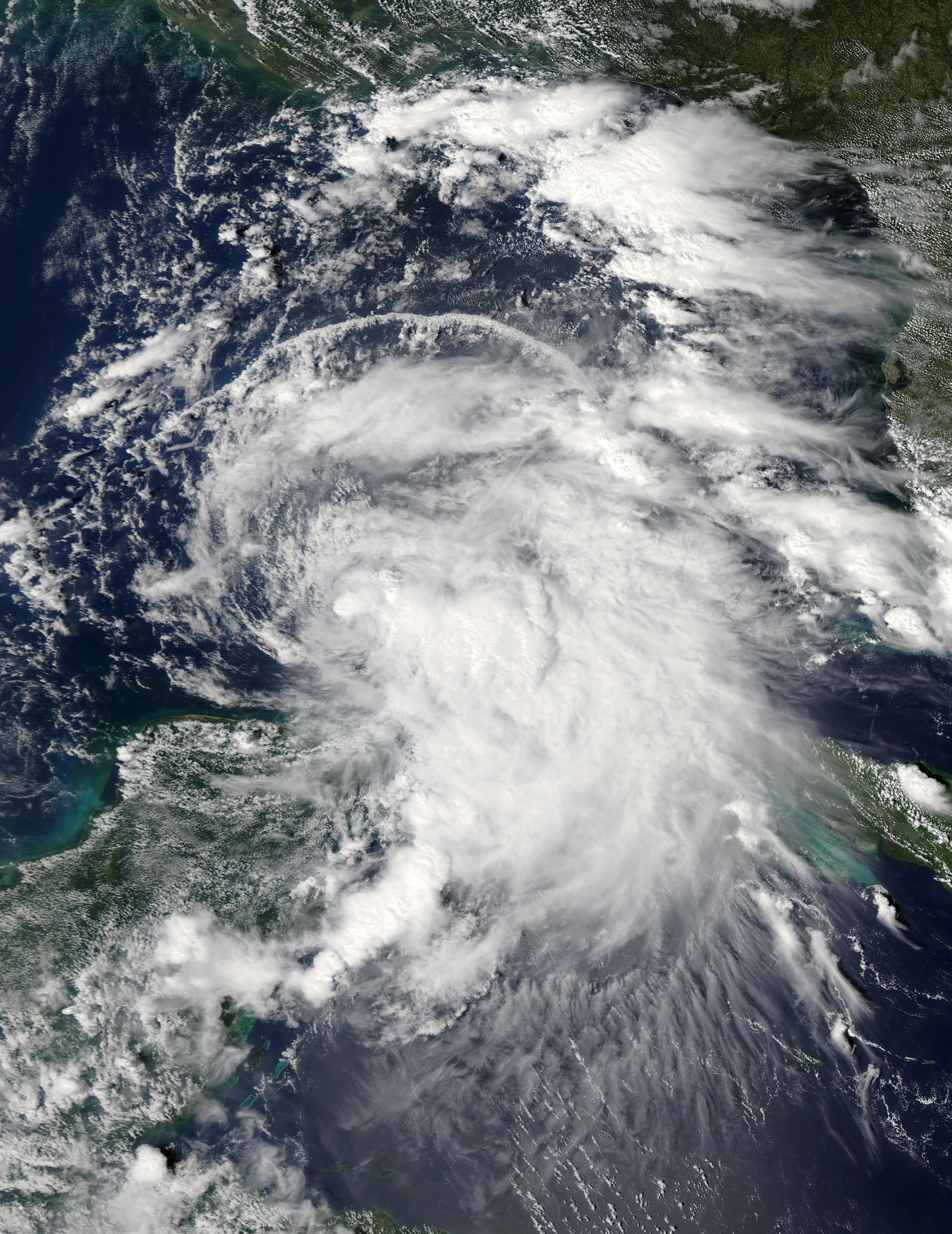
A disorganized Tropical Storm Karen on October 3

October 3

- 06:00 UTC (1:00 a.m. CDT) – Tropical Storm Karen develops about 35 mi (55 km) north of Cancun, Mexico.
- 12:00 UTC (7:00 a.m. CDT) – Tropical Storm Karen attains its peak intensity with maximum sustained winds of 65 mph (100 km/h).
- 18:00 UTC (2:00 p.m. AST) – Tropical Storm Jerry degenerates into a non-convective remnant area of low pressure about 770 mi (1,240 km) southwest of the central Azores.
- 21:00 UTC (4:00 p.m. CDT) – Tropical Storm Karen attains its peak intensity with a minimum barometric pressure of 998 mb (hPa; 29.47 inHg).

October 6

- 00:00 UTC (7:00 p.m. CDT, October 5) – Tropical Storm Karen weakens to a tropical depression about 160 mi (260 km) southwest of New Orleans, Louisiana.
- 12:00 UTC (7:00 a.m. CDT) – Tropical Depression Karen dissipates south of the south-central coast of Louisiana.

October 21

- 06:00 UTC (2:00 a.m. AST) – Tropical Depression Thirteen develops about 620 mi (1,000 km) east-southeast of Bermuda.
- 12:00 UTC (8:00 a.m. AST) – Tropical Depression Thirteen intensifies into Tropical Storm Lorenzo about 615 mi (990 km) southeast of Bermuda.

October 22

- 12:00 UTC (8:00 a.m. AST) – Tropical Storm Lorenzo attains its peak intensity with maximum sustained winds of 50 mph (85 km/h) and a minimum barometric pressure of 1000 mb (hPa; 29.53 inHg).

October 24

- 00:00 UTC (8:00 p.m. AST, October 23) – Tropical Storm Lorenzo weakens to a tropical depression.
- 12:00 UTC (8:00 a.m. AST) – Tropical Depression Lorenzo dissipates about 840 mi (1,350 km) west-southwest of Flores Island, Azores.

=== November ===
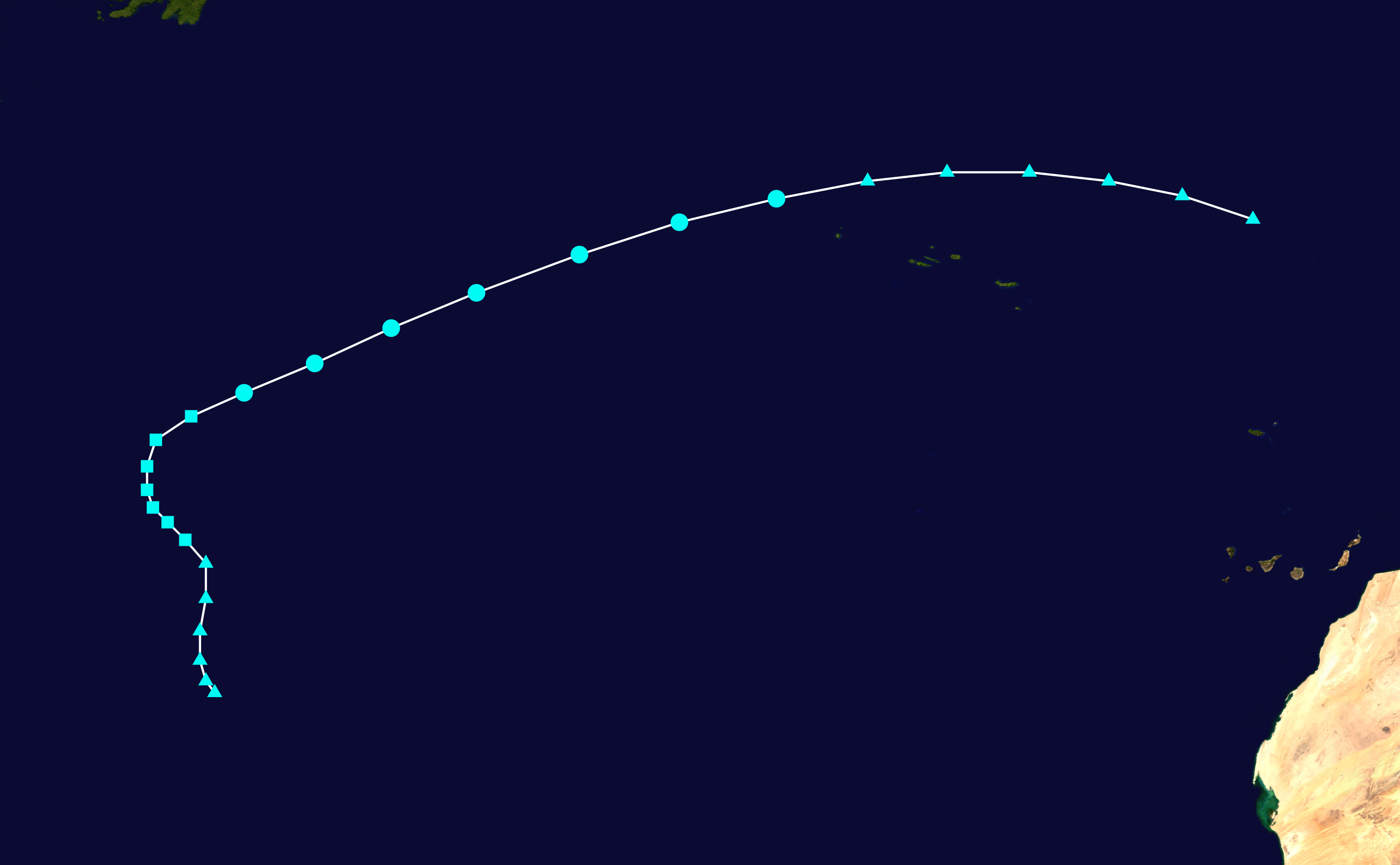
Storm path of Tropical Storm Melissa

November 18

- 12:00 UTC (7:00 a.m. AST) – Subtropical Storm Melissa develops about 720 mi (1,160 km) east-southeast of Bermuda.

November 20

- 06:00 UTC (1:00 a.m. AST) – Subtropical Storm Melissa transitions into a tropical storm about 775 mi (1,245 km) east-northeast of Bermuda.

November 21

- 12:00 UTC (7:00 a.m. AST) – Tropical Storm Melissa attains its peak intensity with maximum sustained winds of 65 mph (100 km/h) and a minimum barometric pressure of 980 mb (hPa; 28.94 inHg).

November 22

- 00:00 UTC (7:00 p.m. AST, November 21) – Tropical Storm Melissa degenerates into a non-convective remnant area of low pressure about 140 mi (220 km) north-northeast of Flores Island, Azores.

November 30

- The 2013 Atlantic hurricane season officially ends.

=== December ===
December 5

- 00:00 UTC (7:00 p.m. AST, December 4) – A subtropical storm develops from an area of low pressure about 385 mi (620 km) south of the Azores and simultaneously attains its peak intensity with maximum sustained winds of 50 mph (85 km/h) and a minimum barometric pressure of 997 mb (hPa; 29.44 inHg).

December 7

- 06:00 UTC (1:00 a.m. AST) – The subtropical storm degenerates into a non-convective remnant area of low pressure about 105 mi (165 km) south of the Azores.

== See also ==
- Lists of Atlantic hurricanes
- Timeline of the 2013 Pacific hurricane season
