= Tropical Storm Harvey (1999) =

Atlantic tropical storm

- Tropical Storm Harvey nearing landfall in Florida on September 20

Meteorological history
- Formed: September 19, 1999
- Dissipated: September 22, 1999

Tropical storm
- 1-minute sustained (SSHWS/NWS)
- Highest winds: 60 mph (95 km/h)
- Lowest pressure: 994 mbar (hPa); 29.35 inHg

Overall effects
- Fatalities: None reported
- Damage: $22.6 million (1999 USD)
- Areas affected: Florida, Georgia, North Carolina, South Carolina, Atlantic Canada
- IBTrACS
- Part of the 1999 Atlantic hurricane season

Tropical Storm Harvey was a moderately strong tropical cyclone that caused flooding across south Florida during the 1999 Atlantic hurricane season. The tenth tropical cyclone and eighth named storm of the season, Harvey developed from a tropical wave in the Gulf of Mexico on September 19. After forming, the system gradually intensified and became a tropical storm early on September 20. Throughout the rest of its duration, Harvey slowly intensified as it headed eastward. Late on September 21, Harvey made landfall in Southwest Florida with winds of 60 mph (95 km/h). Harvey emerged into the Atlantic early on September 22, but was absorbed by an extratropical cyclone. The remnants of Harvey reached Atlantic Canada before dissipating.

Harvey caused minor flooding in south Florida because of light to relatively heavy rainfall in that portion of the state and at least 34 houses and businesses in southern Florida were flooded. There were sporadic reports of tropical storm-force winds throughout the state, as well as two tornadoes. Damage estimates in Florida reached about $15 million (1999 USD). Throughout the rest of the United States, impact was limited, confined to light rainfall in Georgia, North Carolina and South Carolina. Heavy rainfall was reported in Atlantic Canada and Harvey became the wettest tropical cyclone on record in that country. Significant flooding, especially to roads and houses, was reported due to the heavy rainfall, and damage throughout Atlantic Canada totalled several million dollars.

== Meteorological history ==
Map plotting the storm's track and intensity, according to the Saffir–Simpson scale Map key Saffir–Simpson scale Tropical depression (≤38 mph, ≤62 km/h) Tropical storm (39–73 mph, 63–118 km/h) Category 1 (74–95 mph, 119–153 km/h) Category 2 (96–110 mph, 154–177 km/h) Category 3 (111–129 mph, 178–208 km/h) Category 4 (130–156 mph, 209–251 km/h) Category 5 (≥157 mph, ≥252 km/h) Unknown Storm type Tropical cyclone Subtropical cyclone Extratropical cyclone, remnant low, tropical disturbance, or monsoon depression

A tropical wave first emerged from the west coast of Africa on late on September 4, 1999 and entered the Atlantic Ocean. The system trekked westward uneventfully and was unable to organize itself due to the influence of outflow from Hurricane Floyd. After Floyd moved northward, however, the system began developing convection as it traversed the Caribbean Sea. By September 16 the disturbance transitioned into a broad area of low pressure while tracking northwestward in the western Caribbean Sea. After two days the low had continued to intensify as it entered the southern Gulf of Mexico. Thunderstorm activity continued to increase in association with the weather system and a buoy in the eastern Gulf of Mexico recorded sustained winds of 35 mph (56 km/h). At 0600 UTC on September 19, the system finally developed into Tropical Depression Ten, while located approximately 400 miles (640 km) west-southwest of St. Petersburg, Florida. The National Hurricane Center initiated advisories on the depression approximately four hours later.

Upon its designation the depression was still relatively weak and disorganized and, due to a number of factors, further strengthening was expected to be gradual. Outflow over the cyclone improved throughout the day on September 19, however, as it drifted northward. At 0000 UTC on September 20 the depression was upgraded to the eighth named storm of the season, Tropical Storm Harvey, based on surface observations and reports from the Hurricane Hunters. Shortly thereafter the storm became nearly stationary while slowly beginning to turn eastward. Harvey remained disorganized due to persistent wind shear. Despite the strong wind shear, the cyclone managed to reach its peak intensity with maximum sustained winds of 60 mph (95 km/h) and a minimum barometric pressure of 994 mbar (hPa; 29.35 inHg) late on September 20.

By the early on September 21 Harvey accelerated slightly and turned southeastward. Although the center of the storm was poorly defined at the time and located to the northwest of the main area of thunderstorm activity, convection was strong in nature. Later that day the storm curved towards the east while approaching Florida. At around 1700 UTC on September 21 Harvey made landfall near Everglades City, Florida with sustained winds of 60 mph (95 km/h). The storm further accelerated across the Florida Peninsula and quickly merged with a developing storm off the coast of South Carolina at 0600 UTC on September 22. Although the remnants of Harvey became unidentifiable later that day, Environment Canada reported that the system crossed Newfoundland before dissipating on September 24.

== Preparations ==
Early on September 19 a tropical storm watch was issued for the west coast of Florida from Bonita Beach to the mouth of the Suwannee River, which was upgraded to a tropical storm warning and hurricane watch the next day. Tropical storm watches were posted for the state's Atlantic coast north of Jupiter Inlet to near Flagler Beach. A tropical storm watch, and later a warning, was issued for the northwestern Bahamas. The advisories were amended several times before being discontinued on September 20 through September 21.

In advance of the storm, public schools and many private schools closed, Although no mandatory evacuations were ordered, multiple shelters were opened in schools and churches and government offices shut down in anticipation of Harvey's onslaught. Several counties issued a state of emergency. Residents prepared individually by, for example, securing boats and lawn furniture. Free sand and sandbags were made available to the general public and inmates filled bags for those physically unable to do so themselves. Officials at Lake Manatee began lowering the water level to help avoid flooding. In Hillsborough County the threat of the storm forced the cancellation of local football programs.

== Impact ==
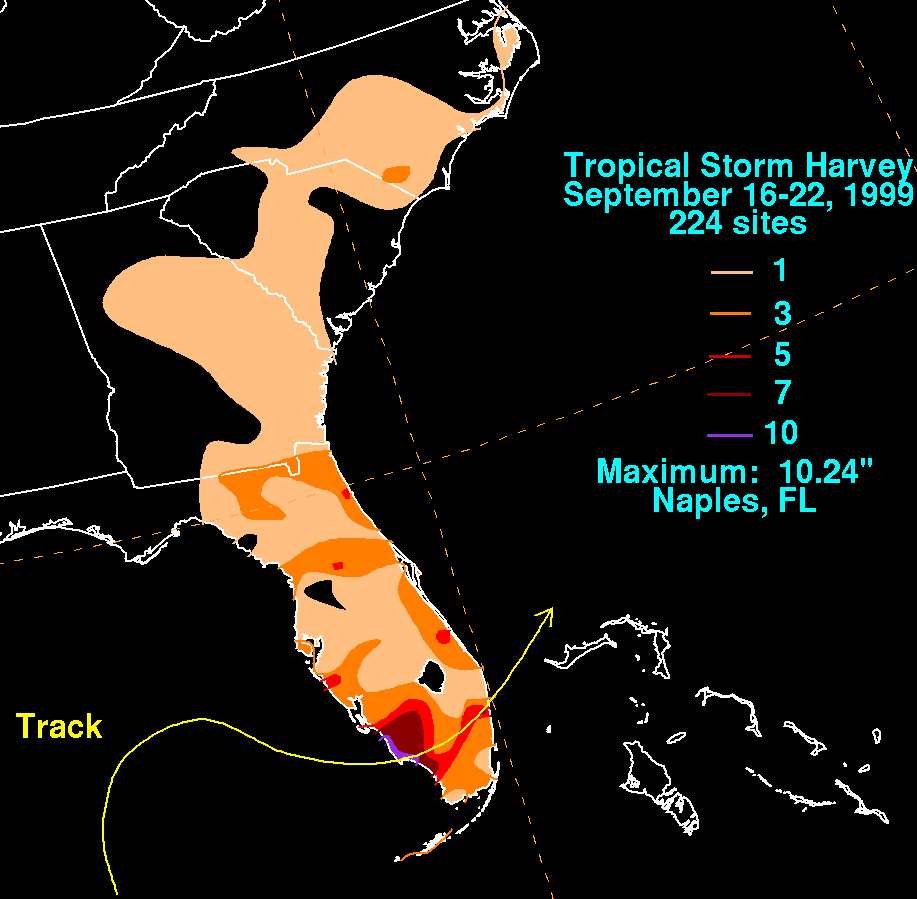
Rainfall totals from Harvey

=== Florida ===
Tropical Storm Harvey dropped moderate to heavy rainfall throughout much of Florida, although the highest amounts were concentrated near its landfall location. Precipitation peaked at 10.24 inches (260 mm) in Naples. The 4 to 7 inches (100 to 180 mm) of rain in southern Lee County caused minor flooding in homes and businesses in lowly-lying areas, mostly along U.S. Route 41 between Estero and Bonita Springs. Storm surge was light, with tides ranging from 1 to 2 feet (0.30 to 0.61 m) above normal in Levy, Citrus, Hernando, Pasco, Pinellas, Hillsborough, Manatee, and Sarasota counties; the highest tide recorded was 2.41 feet (0.73 m) above normal in Fort Myers.

Some tidal flooding occurred at Everglades City, where a runway at the county airport was inundated. Throughout Collier County, coastal flooding caused major street flooding and water entered 34 homes and buildings, as well as six cars. No locations on the East Coast of Florida reported abnormally high tides, although a storm surge of 0.8 feet (0.24 m) and 1 foot (0.30 m) was reported in Key West and Vaca Key, respectively. Minor coastal flooding was reported elsewhere, including along the Florida Keys; part of State Road A1A was closed as a result. The surge combined with increased wave action to produce light beach erosion along the coast and in Everglades National Park.

The storm also spawned two tornadoes, in Collier and Miami-Dade counties, one of which tore the roof off a house. The highest sustained wind speed was 53 mph (85 km/h), which was recorded at the Turkey Point Nuclear Generating Station, while the strongest wind gust was 68 mph (109 km/h) off the coast of Key Largo. Strong winds in the Florida Keys downed a few trees, but minimal damage occurred otherwise. Overall, damage in Florida totaled to approximately $15 million (1999 USD; $29 million 2026 USD).

=== Canada ===
Wettest tropical cyclones and their remnants in Canada Highest-known totals
Precipitation			Storm	Location	Ref.
Rank	mm	in	Storm	Location	Ref.
1	302.0	11.89	Harvey 1999	Oxford, NS	
2	249.9	9.84	Beth 1971	Halifax, NS	
3	238.0	9.37	Igor 2010	St. Lawrence, NL	
4	224.8	8.85	Matthew 2016	Sydney, NS	
5	221	8.70	Debby 2024	Lanoraie, QC	
6	213.6	8.41	Hazel 1954	Snelgrove, ON	
7	212.0	8.35	Fiona 2022	Cape North, NS	
8	210.0	8.26	Earl 2022	Paradise, NL	
9	191.0	7.52	Bertha 1990	Hunters Mountain, NS	
10	185.0	7.28	Sandy 2012	Charlevoix, QC	

==== Nova Scotia ====
In Nova Scotia, the remnants of Harvey dropped torrential amounts of rainfall, peaking at 11.89 inches (302 mm) in Oxford. As a result, the system is, as of 2024, ranked as the wettest known tropical cyclone (or remnants) in Canada. Several other locations reported heavy, but lesser, amounts of precipitation, including 5.9 inches (150 mm) in Cumberland County and Annapolis Valley, 3.5 inches (89 mm) in Greenwood, and between 1.2 inches (30 mm) and 1.7 inches (43 mm) in South Shore and Halifax. Throughout the province there was widespread flooding, countless road closures, and numerous flooded basements. Most notably, a portion of Trans-Canada Highway and Highway 103 was inundated by water. Another major road was closed in Wolfville after Gaspereau River overflowed. A street in Amherst was closed due to sewer backups and, nearby, a culvert washed away, leaving a 49.2 feet (15.0 m) by 65.6 feet (20.0 m) hole in the road. Additionally, a bridge collapsed near Collingwood. In Oxford alone, damage to roads cost at least $3 million (1999 CAD) to repair.

Flooding damage was also reported to infrastructure other than roads. After two rivers overflowed, at least 70% of Oxford was flooded, which included a hardware store and dozens of homes, while a senior citizens living complex were evacuated. The SOS Children's Village in Margaretsville sustained approximately $25,000 (1999 CAD) in flood damage. Schools in Amherst and the University of Windsor canceled afternoon classes on September 24. In the Canning area, 1,500 people were left without power, while electricity was also lost in Annapolis Valley, Yarmouth, Truro, Westville, Amherst, and Stellarton. A woman required rescue by firemen after her van plunged into the swollen River Philip. In Maccan, a tractor trailer loaded with lumber went off the road. Damage in Nova Scotia likely exceeded $5 million (1999 CAD).

==== New Brunswick ====
In New Brunswick, flooding also occurred throughout the province. Rainfall totals in the province include, 6.7 inches (170 mm) in Saint John, 6.5 inches (170 mm) in Fredericton, 5.9 inches (150 mm) in Moncton, 4 inches (100 mm) in Miramichi, 3.6 inches (91 mm) in Acadian Peninsula, 2.7 inches (69 mm) in St. Stephen, 1.9 inches (48 mm) in Campbellton, 2 inches (51 mm) in Bathurst, and 1.2 inches (30 mm) in Saint-Léonard. As a result, three roads were flooded in Saint John, three other streets were closed in Moncton, and one street each was inundated by water in Fox Creek and Riverview. In addition, the causeway connecting Moncton and Riverview was closed due to flood waters. In Dieppe a local state of emergency was declared because of the numerous washed out roads. Along Route 16 travelers rescued four senior citizens from their car, which soon sank into a ditch. Train service by Via Rail was temporarily suspended after the tracks were washed out near Memramcook. Damage in the province of New Brunswick came to several million dollars, most of it in Moncton.

==== Elsewhere in Canada ====
Strong winds were reported in Prince Edward Island, with gusts reaching more than 72 mph (116 km/h), while rainfall was relatively heavy, with a peak of 7 inches (180 mm) in Prince County. At another location, Charlottetown, precipitation totals only reached 2.1 inches (53 mm). Although potato fields were inundated by water, minimal damage occurred to that crop. In Summerside at least five roads were closed due to flooding and water entered the mechanical room via the telephone and electrical conduit at the local intermediate school. Road infrastructure was also affected, such as in Howlan, where a bridge slightly longer than 180 feet (55 m) washed away. Restrictions were imposed on the use of the Confederation Bridge during the height of the storm. Adverse conditions also prevented the Northumberland Ferry from docking in Prince Edward Island, causing it to return to Nova Scotia.

As rainfall in Newfoundland peaked at only 1.6 inches (41 mm), damage in the province was mostly from strong winds. At Channel-Port aux Basques, a sustained wind speed of almost 66 mph (106 km/h) and gust to nearly 80 mph (130 km/h) were reported. Strong winds left 4,500 people without electricity in St. John's and the Burin Peninsula, knocked down traffic lights in St. John's, and snapped and uprooted trees throughout the province. On the main land of Newfoundland and Labrador, rainfall was mostly between 2 and 3.9 inches (51 and 99 mm).

=== Elsewhere ===
The Tropicale, then owned by Carnival Cruise Lines, was left disabled after a fire on board shut down the vessel's engines. The ship encountered 12 ft (3.7 m) seas in the Gulf of Mexico before restarting one of its engines and taking a path around the storm, having initially planned to return to Tampa. The ship provided meteorological reports from the storm that were used to evaluate its winds. In the Bahamas Harvey caused flooding in low-lying areas of three islands. In Georgia, much of the state reported rainfall, although totals did not reach 3 inches (76 mm), with a peak amount of 2.9 inches (74 mm) in Brunswick. Precipitation amounts were similar in South Carolina, peaking at 2.6 inches (66 mm) in Wagener. Rainfall was slightly heavier in North Carolina, with a few areas experiencing more than 3 inches (76 mm).

== See also ==
- List of Canada hurricanes
- List of Florida hurricanes (1975–1999)
- List of North Carolina hurricanes (1980–1999)
- Other storms of the same name
