= Cuyaguateje River =

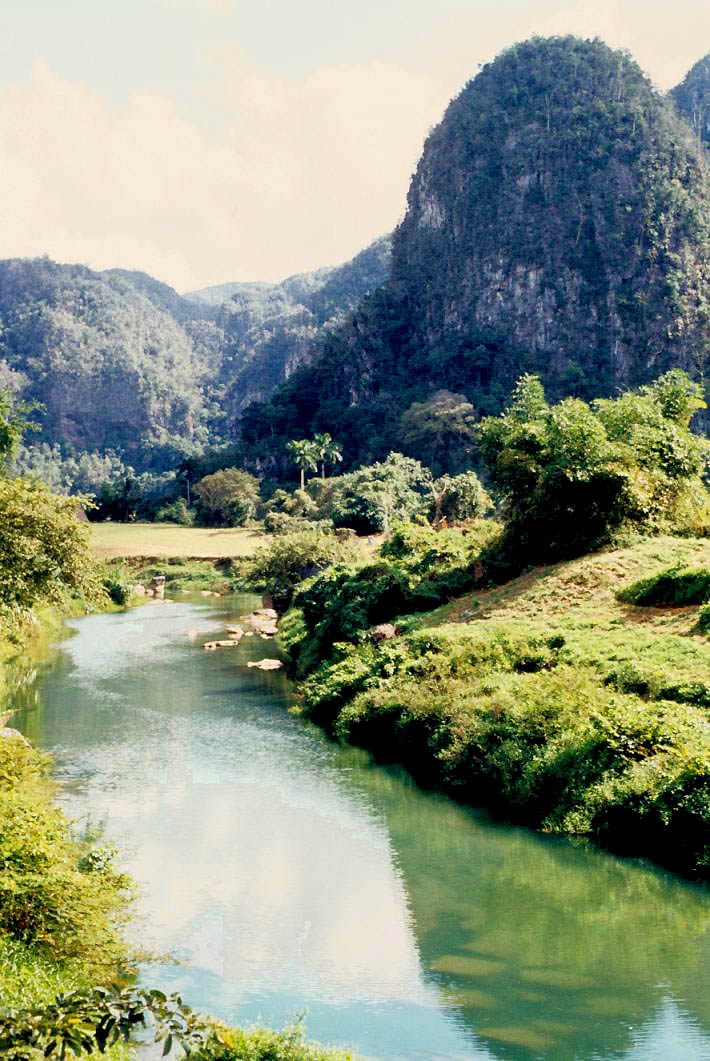

Location
- Country: Cuba

Cuyaguateje River is a river of southern Cuba. It is a prominent watercourse flowing through the western region of Cuba. With a length of approximately 120 kilometers (75 miles), it plays a significant role in the hydrology and ecology of the area, as well as in the cultural and historical narratives of the region.

== See also ==
- List of rivers of Cuba
